= MS Giulio Cesare =

Italian ocean liner (1950–1973)

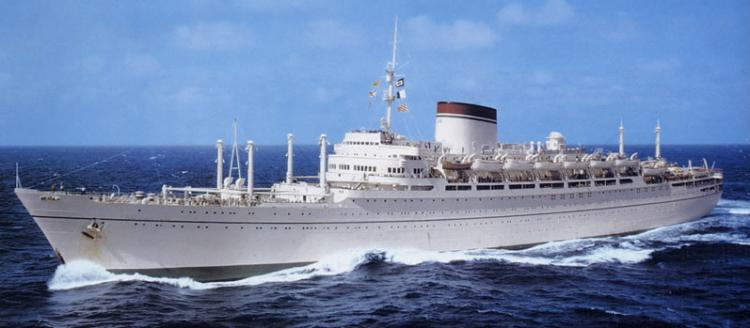

History

Italy
- Name: MS Giulio Cesare
- Namesake: Julius Caesar
- Operator: Italian Line
- Port of registry: Genoa, Italy
- Route: 1951-1956: Genoa-Buenos Aires; 1956-1960: Genoa-New York City; 1960-1973: Genoa-Buenos Aires
- Builder: Cantieri Riuniti dell' Adriatico, Trieste, Italy
- Yard number: Number 1756
- Launched: 18 May 1950 by Md. Donna Ida Einaudi, wife of the President of Italy
- Completed: 27 October 1951
- Maiden voyage: 27 October 1951
- Out of service: 14 January 1973
- Fate: Scrapped on 20 April 1973 at Terrestre Marittima Shipyards, La Spezia, Italy

General characteristics
- Type: Ocean liner
- Tonnage: 27,078 GRT
- Length: 207 m / 681 ft
- Beam: 26.6 m / 87.2 ft
- Draught: 8.5 m / 28 ft
- Installed power: powered by “Societa Anonima Fiat” diesel engines
- Propulsion: Twin screws -37,000 BHP; 16.5
- Speed: 23.3 knots
- Capacity: 1950-1964: First: 178 Cabin: 288 Tourist: 714; 1964-1973: First: 180 Tourist: Approx 1,000
- Crew: 493

MS Giulio Cesare was a luxurious ocean liner built for the Italian Line. She was a sister ship to MS Augustus which was launched in the same year. She was built for the South America service like her sister. These two ships' specification and design were very similar.

During World War II, the Italian Line had lost a large portion of its fleet, including the ocean liner SS Rex. The surviving ships were refitted and repaired, and returned to passenger service after the war was over. However, the surviving ships like MS Saturnia and her sister ship MS Vulcania, and the SS Conte Grande and her sister ship SS Conte Biancamano, all could carry small numbers of passengers. The Italian Line needed new liners for the South American service. It placed an order with Cantieri Riuniti dell' Adriatico to build two new 27,000 GRT ocean liners, to be christened Giulio Cesare and Augustus.

The building of the 27,000 GRT Giulio Cesare and Augustus marked the start of a new era for the Italian Line; furthermore, other large Italian liners were being built, such as the SS Andrea Doria and her sister ship SS Cristoforo Colombo, both 29,000 GRT. In 1958, these two great liners were followed by SS Leonardo da Vinci. SS Michelangelo and her sister ship SS Raffaello which were the last and the biggest liners of the Italian Line.

== Design and construction ==
MS Giulio Cesare was built by Cantieri Riuniti dell' Adriatico, Monfalcone (Yard #1756) but was engines by Societa Anonima Fiat, Turin. She was launched on 18 May 1950, in the presence of Md. Donna Ida Einaudi, wife of the President of Italy. The ship was completed in September 1951 and made her maiden voyage on 27 October 1951, from Genoa to Naples and then to Buenos Aires.

The Augustus and the Giulio Cesare were powered by Societa Anonima Fiat diesel engines. These engines were the largest and most powerful ever built, and were found to cause severe vibrations in her passenger accommodation, however, they produced 35,000 HP, providing 23.3 knots, which made her popular.

The exterior design of Giulio Cesare and her sister attracted many passengers because of their fat and round bows, curved superstructures, modern masts, tall large funnel, and graceful sterns. They also provided full air-conditioning for passengers. The ships were divided into three classes: First, Cabin, and Tourist. There were swimming pools for each class. The First class cabins had two or four roomed suites, one and two berth cabins, and private facilities and phones. The Cabin class were provided with a bathroom and one, two or four berth cabins. The Tourist Class accommodation lacked some of the luxuries of the other classes, but were still considered modern and comfortable .

== Service history ==
She was initially placed on the Genoa-Buenos Aires service after her maiden voyage. But she was transferred to the Genoa-Cannes-Naples-New York City service on 29 June 1956, and operated this route until 1960 when she was returned to the Italy-South America route after she has made 32 round voyages on the North Atlantic route. She remained on her South America route for the next thirteen years. She was refitted in 1964. After the refit, she received a new cinema, and the Cabin and Tourist Class dining rooms were combined. Her three classes were also merged into a First and Tourist class after the refit. However the number of passengers she and her sisters were carrying began to decline. She developed problems with her rudder on 14 January 1973, and had to return to Naples. The Italian Line decided to sell her for scrap. She was laid up at Naples on 14 January, and departed on 20 April for the Terrestre Marittima Shipyards, La Spezia, Italy where she was broken up, the first post-war built Italian liner to be scrapped.
