= SS Cristoforo Colombo =

Italian passenger ship

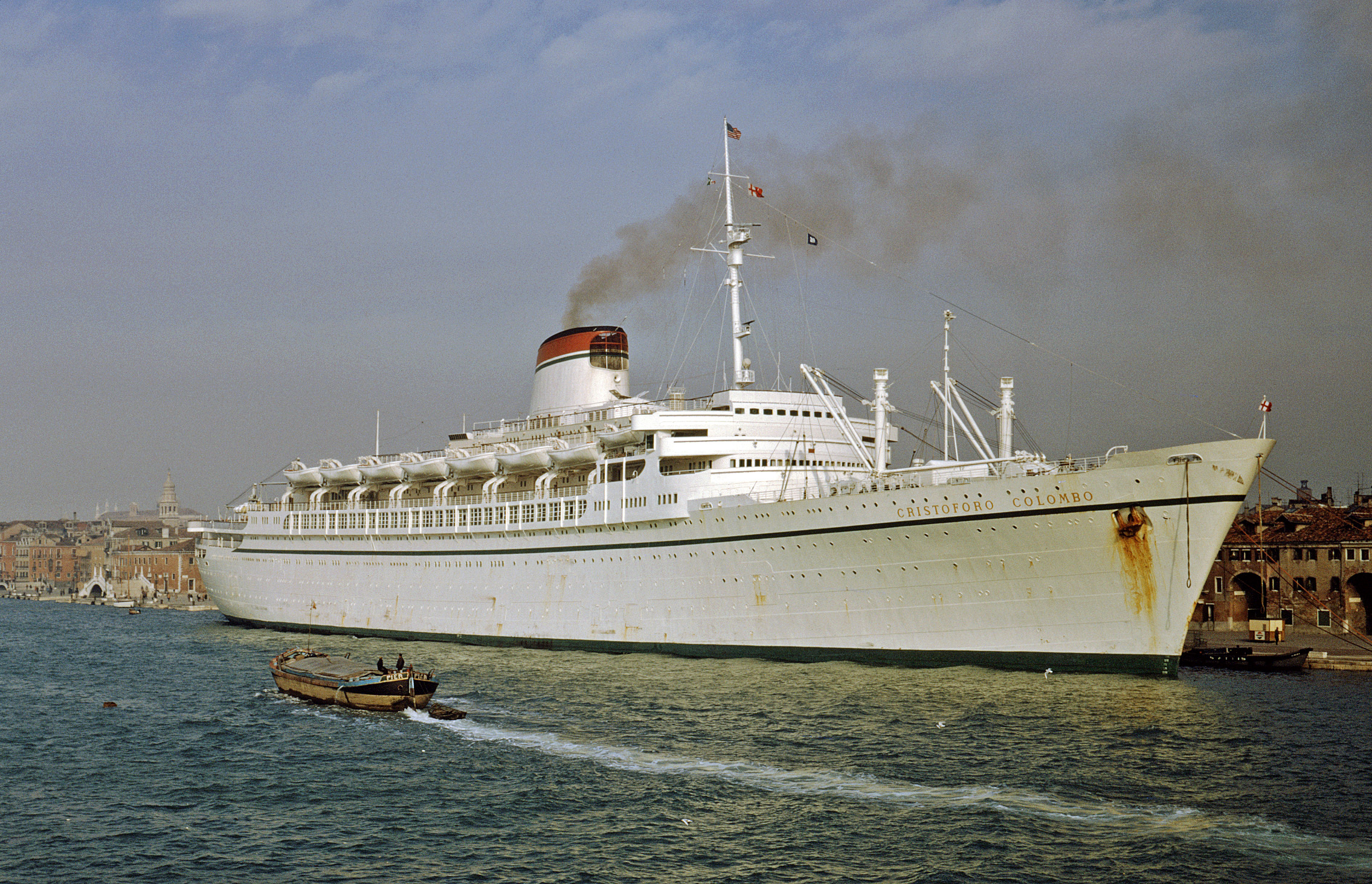
- SS Cristoforo Colombo photographed in the port of Venice, in October 1972

History

Italy
- Name: SS Cristoforo Colombo
- Namesake: Christopher Columbus
- Owner: Italian Line
- Port of registry: Italy
- Builder: Ansaldo Shipyards of Genoa, Italy
- Launched: 10 May 1953
- Maiden voyage: 15 July 1954
- Fate: Scrapped in 1982 at Kaohsiung, Taiwan

General characteristics
- Class & type: Andrea Doria-class Ocean liner
- Tonnage: 29,191 gross register tons
- Length: 700 feet (216.6 m)
- Beam: 90 feet (27.9 m)
- Installed power: Steam turbines
- Propulsion: Twin screws
- Speed: 23 knots
- Capacity: Passengers: 229 First Class; 222 Cabin Class; 604 Tourist Class; 1,055 total

SS Cristoforo Colombo (Italian pronunciation: [kriˈstɔːforo koˈlombo]) was an Italian ocean liner built in the 1950s, sister ship of the SS Andrea Doria.

== History ==
=== Origins and construction ===
Contemporary postcard of the Cristoforo Colombo

World War II was devastating to the Italian Line. Their two newest and largest transatlantic liners, the SS Rex and the SS Conte di Savoia, had been destroyed. In the aftermath of the war, the Italian Line decided to build moderately-sized ships that would be luxurious, comfortable, and stylish.

The Andrea Doria and her sister ship the Cristoforo Colombo were built in Genoa at the Ansaldo Shipyards. The Doria was launched in 1951 and made her maiden voyage in January 1953, while the Cristoforo Colombo was launched five months later, in May 1953, and made her maiden voyage in July 1954. The Cristoforo Colombo was slightly larger than the Andrea Doria, making her the largest merchant ship in Italian service.

=== Italian Line service ===
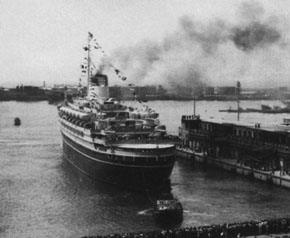
The Cristoforo Colombo departing Genoa on her maiden voyage

The Andrea Doria sank in 1956, following a collision with the MS Stockholm. The Cristoforo Colombo sailed on her own until 1960, when she was joined by the Andrea Doria's replacement, SS Leonardo da Vinci.

In the spring of 1964, the Cristoforo Colombo carried the Pietà from the Vatican to the 1964 New York World's Fair. The Pietà was put in a crate filled with plastic foam, which was lowered onto a rubber base in the first class pool where the least damage was likely to happen to it. If the Cristoforo Colombo sank during the voyage, the crate would float free from the pool. Only easily removable snap hooks secured the crate so that it could be released in case of accident. During loading, the Cristoforo Colombo was put in dry dock, so she would not move and jeopardize the crate and its contents. In New York, the crate was lifted by a heavy-lift floating crane onto a barge alongside the ship.

The Cristoforo Colombo and the Leonardo da Vinci served as the flagships of the Italian Line on the North Atlantic until 1965, when the new SS Michelangelo and SS Raffaello entered service. The hull of the Cristoforo Colombo was painted entirely in 1966, matching the other ships in the Italian Line, which had abandoned black as a hull color. The ship brought many Italian postwar immigrants to the United States and Canada, calling at Halifax and New York in the last decades of large-scale ocean liner immigration to North America. Cristoforo Colombo was the last ship to bring immigrants to the historical Canadian immigration terminal Pier 21 on March 30, 1971, the day before the Pier closed its doors.

In 1973, the Cristoforo Colombo was reassigned from the New York service to the Genoa-Barcelona-Lisbon-Rio-Montevideo-Buenos Aires service, replacing the MS Giulio Cesare, which had suffered serious mechanical problems. The South American service accepted older ships with a lower standard of maintenance.

=== Later years ===
In 1977, the Italian Line sold the vessel to the government of Venezuela, where she was used as an accommodation ship for workers during the construction of the planned city of Ciudad Guayana. She arrived at Puerto Ordaz in September 1977 and was anchored in the Orinoco River and renamed Residencias Cristóbal Colón.

In 1981, the vessel was sold to Taiwanese scrappers. However, upon arrival at Kaohsiung, the Cristoforo Colombo was towed to Hong Kong with hopes of returning to service. As the ship was expensive to operate (she was designed to operate on an Italian subsidy) and was in poor condition after her time in Venezuela, the Cristoforo Colombo was towed back to Kaohsiung in the autumn of 1982 and scrapped in 1983.

== In popular culture ==
The Cristoforo Colombo is prominently featured in the 1962 Warner Brothers film Rome Adventure starring Suzanne Pleshette, Troy Donahue and Rossano Brazzi. The opening titles of the 1971 film The Burglars ("Le Casse") by Henri Verneuil shows the Cristoforo Colombo at dock in Athens, Greece. The ship's name is clearly seen.
