= SS Leonardo da Vinci (1958) =

Ocean liner

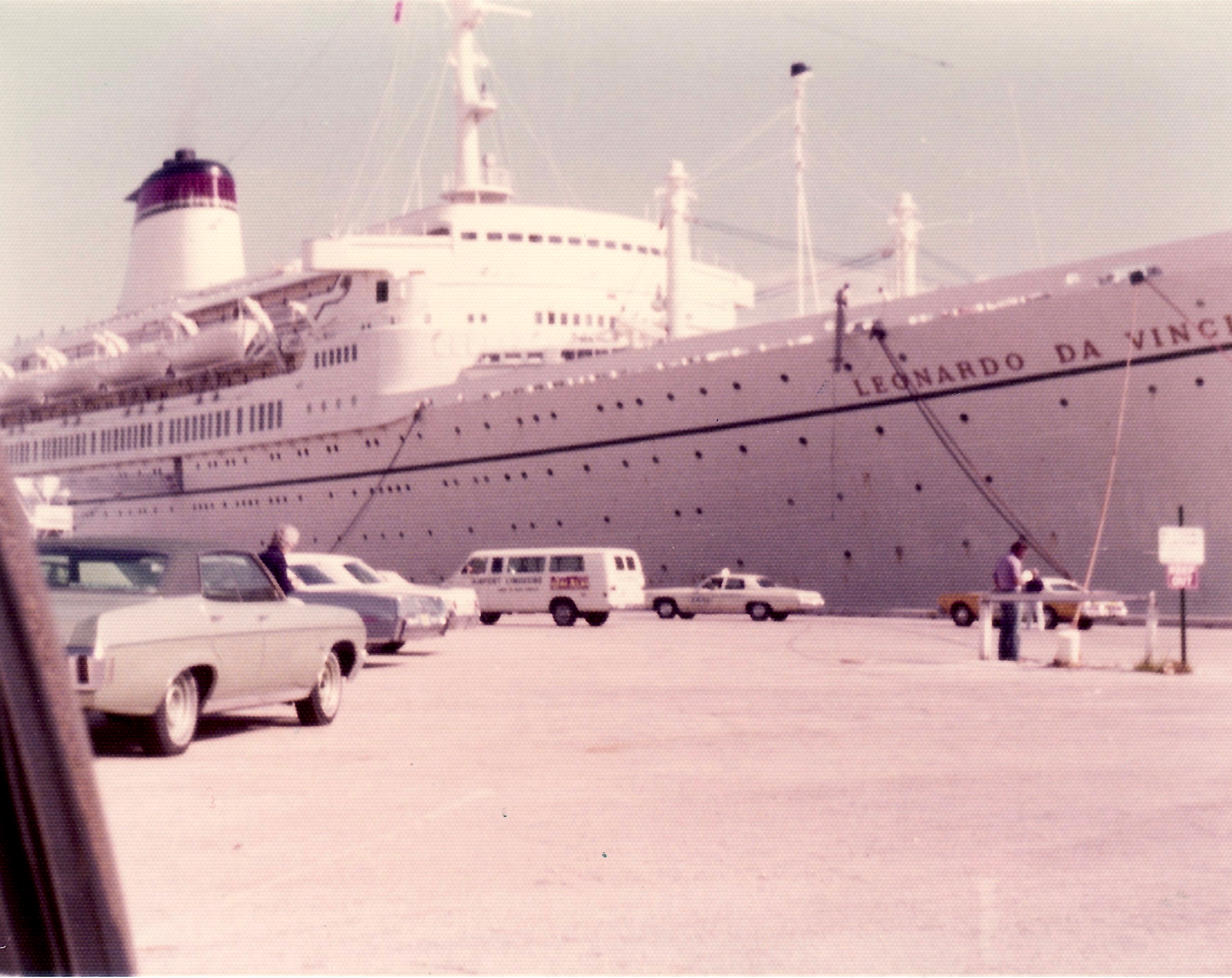
- SS Leonardo da Vinci in Port Everglades, 1975

History
- Name: Leonardo da Vinci
- Namesake: SS Leonardo da Vinci (1924)
- Owner: 1960–1977: Italian Line; 1977–1982: Italia Crociere
- Operator: 1960–1976: Italian Line; 1976–1977: laid up; 1977–1978: Italia Crociere; 1978–1982: laid up
- Port of registry: Genoa, Italy
- Builder: Ansaldo Shipyards, Genoa, Italy
- Yard number: 1550
- Laid down: 1958
- Launched: 7 December 1958
- Christened: 7 December 1958; by Carla Gronchi
- Maiden voyage: 30 June 1960
- In service: 30 June 1960
- Out of service: 23 September 1978
- Identification: IMO number: 5206518
- Fate: Caught fire and capsized in 1980, scrapped 1982

General characteristics
- Type: Ocean liner
- Tonnage: 33,340 GRT; 5,641 DWT
- Length: 232.60 m (763.12 ft)
- Beam: 28.10 m (92.19 ft)
- Draught: 9.55 m (31.33 ft)
- Decks: 12
- Installed power: 4 × Ansaldo steam turbines; combined 38792 kW
- Propulsion: Twin screws
- Speed: 23 knots (43 km/h; 26 mph) (service); 25.5 knots (47.2 km/h; 29.3 mph) (maximum)
- Capacity: 1,326 passengers (413 first class, 342 cabin class, 571 tourist class) in liner service; 984 passengers in cruise service
- Crew: 770

SS Leonardo da Vinci was an ocean liner built in 1960 by Ansaldo Shipyards, Italy for the Italian Line as a replacement for their SS Andrea Doria that had been lost in 1956. She was initially used in transatlantic service alongside SS Cristoforo Colombo, and primarily for cruising after the delivery of the new SS Michelangelo and SS Raffaello in 1965. In 1976 the Leonardo da Vinci became the last Italian Line passenger liner to be used in service across the North Atlantic. Between 1977 and 1978 she was used as a cruise ship by Italia Crociere but was laid up from 1978 onwards until 1982 when she was scrapped.

Named after the famous Italian inventor and artist Leonardo da Vinci, the ship featured numerous technological innovations, including provisions for conversion to run on nuclear power.

== Concept and construction ==
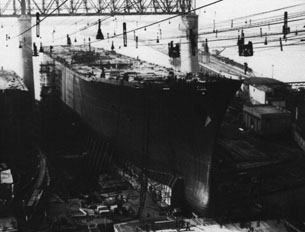
Leonardo da Vinci prior to launch

The Italian Line lost most of its passenger liners during World War II, including the prestigious SS Rex and SS Conte di Savoia. All of the ships that did survive the war dated from the 1920s. In 1949 the company received subsidies from the Italian government to build two new liners of approximately 30,000 gross register tons for the transatlantic service to New York City. These were delivered in 1953 and 1954 as SS Andrea Doria and SS Cristoforo Colombo, respectively, re-establishing Italy in the transatlantic service business with the finest ships to serve on the New York—Mediterranean run. But the Andrea Doria sank after just three years of service on 25 July 1956 after colliding with the Swedish American Line ship MS Stockholm. This left the Italian Line in need of a second ship on the North Atlantic run.

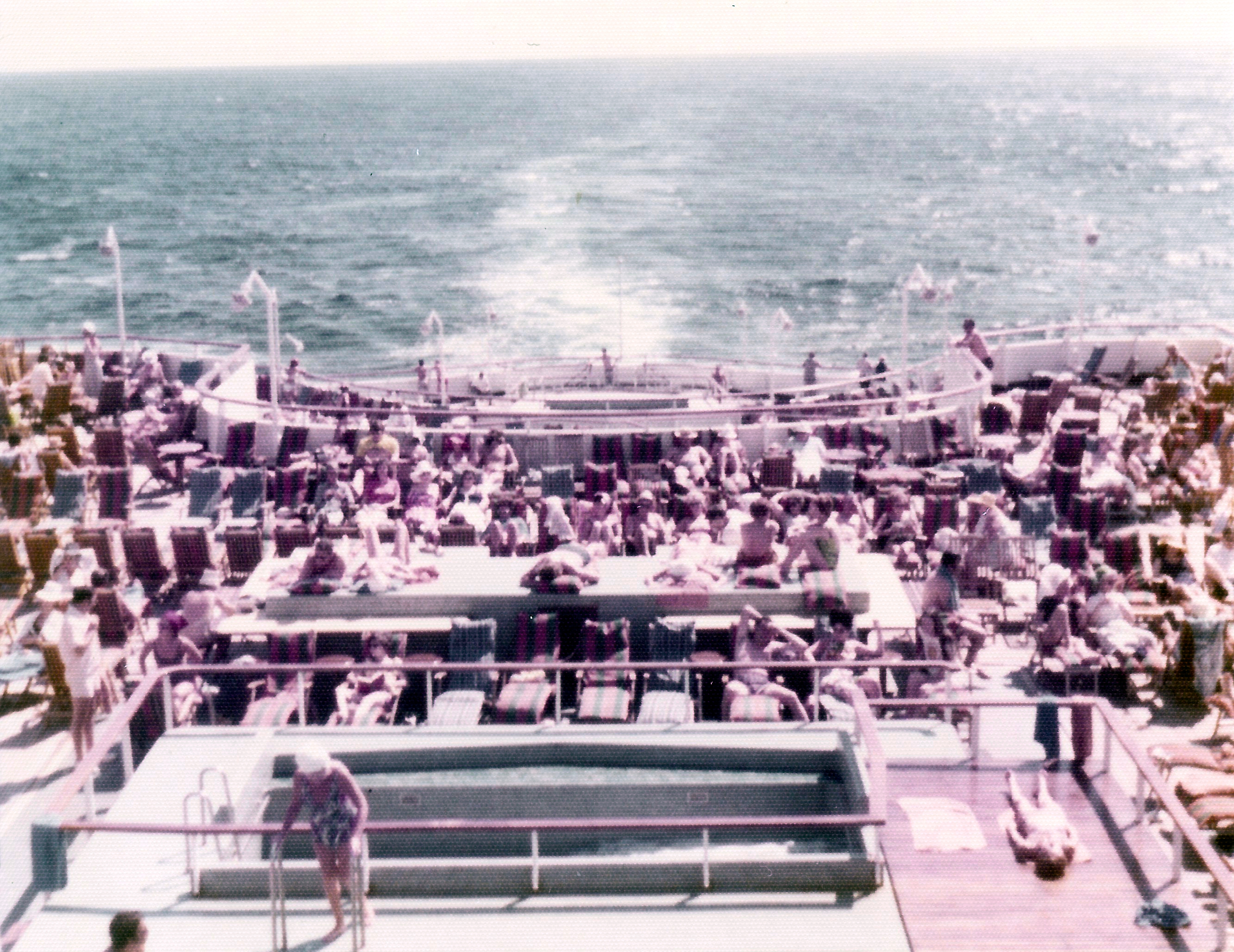
Onboard, 1975

Immediately following the sinking of the Andrea Doria the board of the Italian Line was divided into three groups: one group participated in the court hearings about the disaster, the second concentrated on running the company's existing operations, and a third group drew plans for the new ship needed to replace the Andrea Doria. In order to save time in constructing the new vessel, the plans of the Andrea Doria were used but adapted to a somewhat larger design. Several innovations and new safety features were introduced on the new ship, eventually named Leonardo da Vinci. The new safety features included extended watertight bulkheads, lifeboat davits capable of launching lifeboats against a 25 degree list, motorized lifeboats, and separation of the engine rooms into two compartments, with each engine driving its own propeller and capable of powering the ship independently from the other. Other notable features were infrared-heated swimming pools (but only in first class), retractable stabilizer wings, full air-conditioning, and private bathrooms in all cabins in first and cabin class, as well as in 80% of tourist-class cabins. Moreover, provisions were made to convert the ship to run on nuclear power.

Construction of the new ship was awarded to the Ansaldo Shipyard at Genoa, where on 7 December 1958 she was launched and christened by Carla Gronchi, the wife of Giovanni Gronchi, the President of the Italian Republic. The ship was delivered during the first half of 1960. Like the Andrea Doria and Cristoforo Colombo, the Leonardo da Vinci proved to be a tender ship (prone to instability) in rough weather. But the Leonardo da Vinci's stability problem was greater because of her larger size, and as a result 3000 metric tons of iron were fitted along her bottom to improve stability. This made the ship excessively heavy for the power of her engines and led to extremely high fuel expenses.

== Service history ==
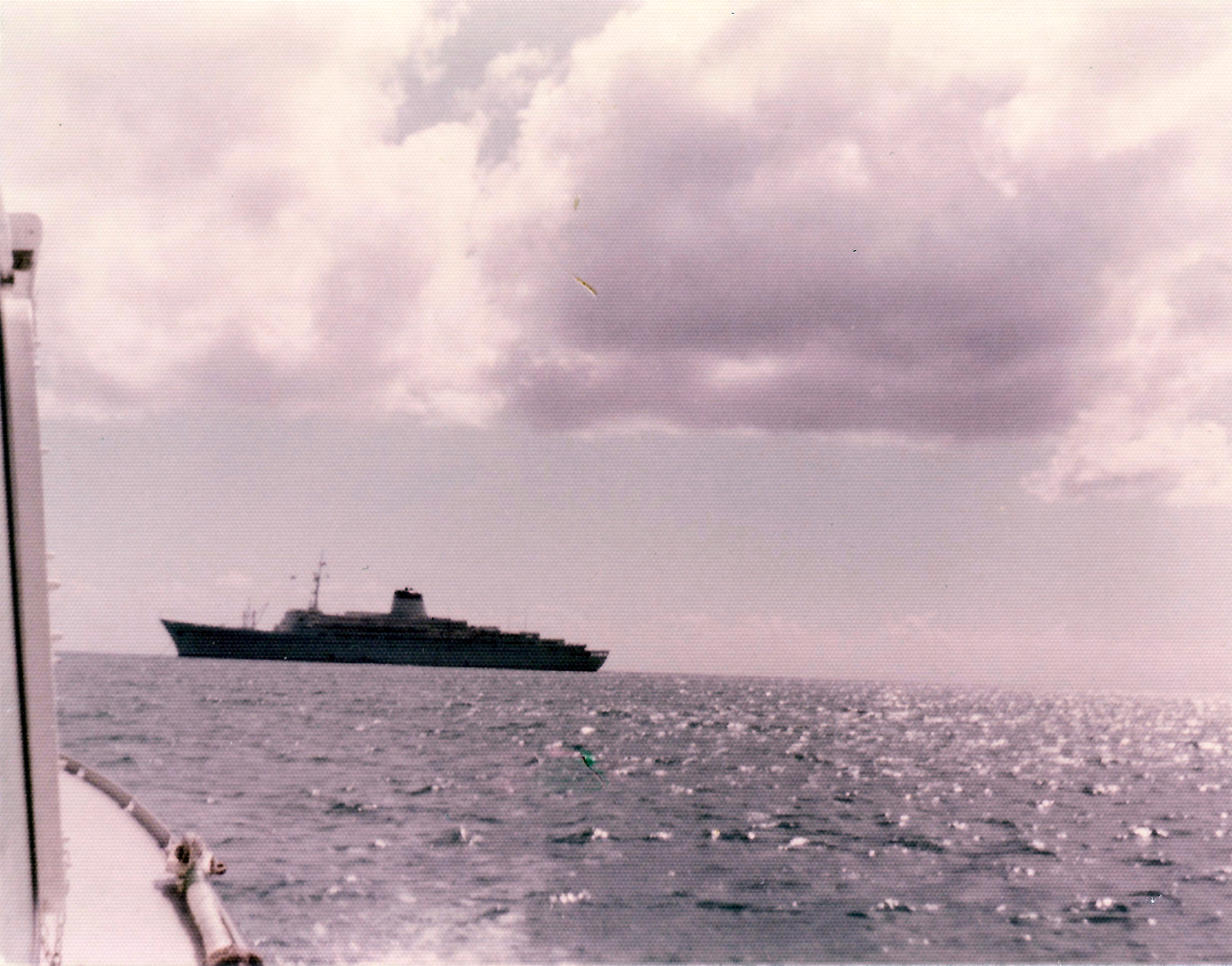
Leonardo da Vinci photographed from another ship in February 1975

On 30 June 1960, under the command of the Italian Line's Senior Captain, Com.te Sup. Armando Pinelli, the Leonardo da Vinci set out on her maiden voyage from Genoa to New York City, where she received the traditional festive welcome accorded liners arriving in the city for the first time. Soon after she entered service, the Italian Line announced that by 1965 at latest the ship would be refit to run on nuclear power. This however did not come to pass, and anyway at the time of the announcement it was already known to executives of the company that by 1965 the Leonardo da Vinci would be supplanted on the North Atlantic service by the new SS Michelangelo and SS Raffaello, the planning for which already had started in 1958.

After the Michelangelo and Raffaello were delivered in May and July 1965, respectively, the Leonardo da Vinci was used primarily for cruising, mostly around the Mediterranean, but also sometimes to the Caribbean, South America, and North America. The majority of her Tourist-class cabins were considered too spartan for cruise service and remained unused when the ship was used for cruising, further cutting the profitability of the ship. In 1966 she was re-painted in the new livery of the Italian Line, a white hull with a longitudinal thin, green decorative band, instead of her original black hull with a white decorative band. In February 1970 the ship departed on her most extensive cruise, a 41-day journey from the Mediterranean to Hawaii via the Panama Canal and back again. During the 1970s competition from jet aircraft became more and more pressing on the North Atlantic service. In 1975 the Italian Line decided to withdraw both the Michelangelo and Raffaello from service. But despite the withdrawal of state subsidiaries, the Italian Line did not withdraw from the North Atlantic service altogether and the Leonardo da Vinci returned to her original route for a short period until June 1976, when she too was withdrawn from service and laid up.

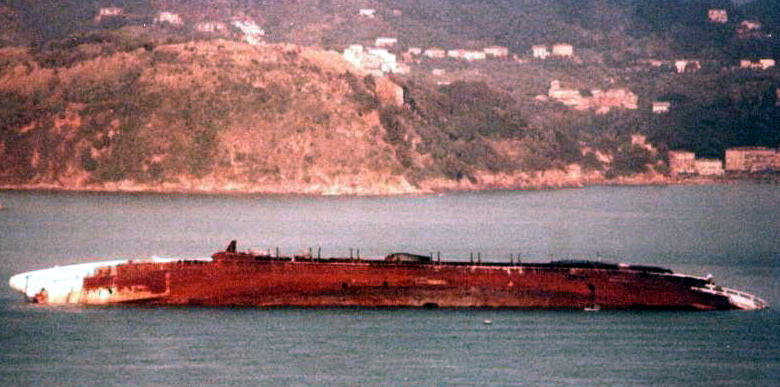
Leonardo da Vinci burnt-out and capsized in La Spezia, July 1980

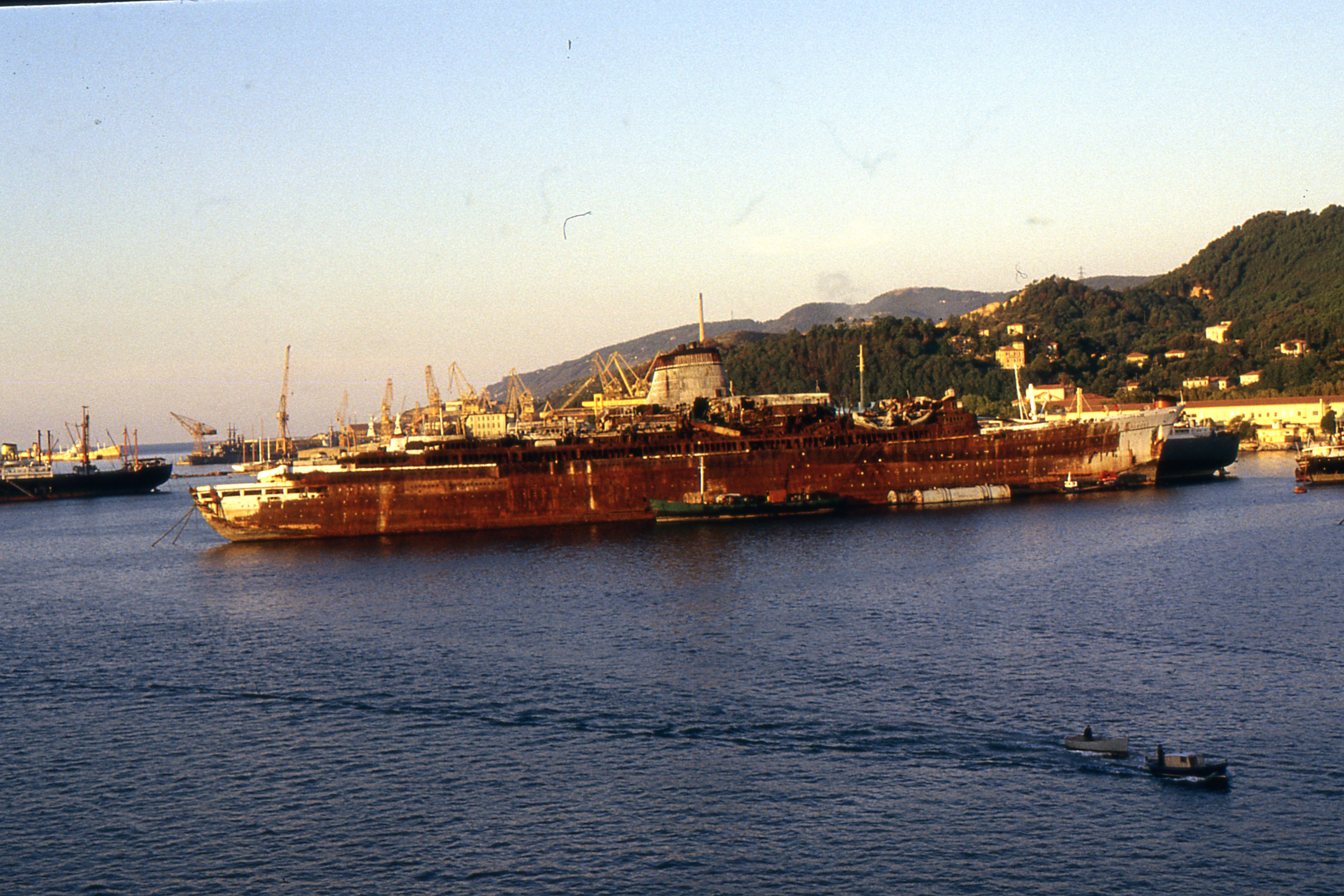
The burnt-out hull of Leonardo da Vinci at La Spezia before being scrapped, January 1982

In 1977 the Leonardo da Vinci was brought back into service, this time for cruising under the banner of Italia Crociere (also known as Italian Line Cruises), a newly formed subsidiary of the Italian Line. The ship was used on one-night cruises from Miami to Nassau, Bahamas, but proved unnecessarily large and too expensive to operate on a service of that kind. On 23 September 1978 the Leonardo da Vinci returned to La Spezia, Italy to be laid up.

Despite numerous rumors to the contrary, she never saw service again. After the ship had been laid up for two years, a fire started on board on 4 July 1980. She burned for four days and eventually capsized. The burnt-out hull was later righted and towed to the scrapyard at La Spezia where it was scrapped in 1982.

== Design ==
=== Exterior ===
The exterior design of the Leonardo da Vinci was very similar to that of the Andrea Doria and Cristoforo Colombo. But she was 19 m (62.34 ft) longer, had a larger forward and aft superstructure, and a slightly different-shaped funnel that included a smoke deflector fin. Moreover, she did not have any freight handling equipment on her rear decks, resulting in a larger lido area compared to that of her older near-sisters.

Visually one of the most nicely-balanced ships of that (or perhaps any) era, she originally had an identical livery to that used in the Andrea Doria and Cristoforo Colombo, with a black hull with a longitudinal thin white band painted two-thirds of the way up from the bottom of the black-painted area. In 1966 her livery (like that of all Italian Line ships) was altered to match the design used on the Michelangelo and Raffaello, with a white hull and a thin green band painted where the upper edge of the black hull colour previously ended.

=== Interior ===
Because of the provisions made for conversion to run on nuclear power, the Leonardo da Vinci had a somewhat unusual interior layout. Space for a reactor was reserved amidship, in and around the ship's steam turbine power plant. This made it necessary to locate the dining rooms and galleys one deck higher than usual, and separated from the ship's main working passage. No passenger corridors passed through the area reserved for a reactor, which meant the forward and rear passenger-accessible sections on the lowest decks were entirely separated from each other.

The public spaces of the ship were designed by several Italian designers, including Vincenzo Monaco and Amedeo Luccichenti who were responsible for the ballroom and cocktail bar.
