= Vincenzo Monaco =

Italian architect (1911–1969)

Vincenzo Monaco (20 July 1911 Rome – 3 March 1969, Rome) was an Italian architect who collaborated with Amedeo Luccichenti from 1933 to 1963. During this period, Monaco designed more than 450 projects, of which approximately 100 were built. His work can be seen in buildings in Rome, Pisa, Naples, and Taranto, as well as in Dalmatia, Iran, France, and Tunisia.

== Career ==
Even before receiving a degree in architecture from Sapienza University of Rome in 1934, Monaco collaborated with F. Petrucci and C. Longo in national competitions; one in 1933 to design four new postal buildings in Rome, and one in 1934 to design the Clinical Hospital of Modena. In 1936, he worked with G. Calza Bini, S. Muratori, F. Petrucci, Ludovico Quaroni, and E. Tedeschi on the sixth Triennale di Milano.

In 1937, Monaco began working with Luccichenti, a partnership that would last until 1963. Together, they worked on the Augustine Exhibition of the Roman Empire (Italian: Mostra Augustea della Romanità) and the Palazzo dei Congressi in EUR, Rome, in 1938; buildings at the Circus Maximus in 1953; the Olympic Village for the 1960 Summer Olympics in Rome from 1958–60; Leonardo da Vinci–Fiumicino Airport from 1957–60; the SIAE building in EUR from 1963–65, the Roccaraso Church in 1966; and the Jolly Hotel in Rome in 1968.

The collaboration between Monaco and Luccichenti influenced the design of a number of apartment buildings, villas, and Roman houses from 1945 to 1955. They were noted for their experimental and rational style, which can be seen in several buildings in Rome, including the office of the Shipping Company of Italy, KLM's air travel agency on Via Barberini, a Lancia dealership, and the SIAE building on Via Emanuele Gianturco; the restructurations of Caffè Rosati in via Veneto at the 1946 and the night club Le Pleiadi in via Sistina, 1947, both places of worship of Dolce Vita.

At the end of the 1950s, the Monaco-Luccichenti Studio was chosen by the Ministry of Public Works to manage the international engineering and architectural work for the 1960 Summer Olympics, including the Olympic Village, in collaboration with Adalberto Libera, Luigi Moretti, Vittorio Cafiero, and Pier Luigi Nervi.

In 1955, during the presidency of Giovanni Gronchi, Monaco realized the restructuring of the Lupa Hall at Palazzo Montecitorio. Other works include the enlargement of Castelporziano, the official palace in San Rossore, the Villa Maria Pia in the estate of the president, Villa Rosebery in Naples.

Other works to remember are: In Rome in 1948, Palazzina Street S. Valentino, 3; buildings between S.Crescenziano street and Via Salaria (Villa Ada Park); 1949 Building in Viale Parioli, 92-96; Buildings in via Circo Massimo 1-9; Villas in Fregene and Santa Marinella; 1951 Offices Building in Via Po; 1957 apartments building in Via Archimede 156; Building in Via Stoppani, 10; 1953 Building in Avenue Villa Grazioli, 26; Building in via Ximenes, 3; 1962 Buildings intensive in Via Prenestina, 4; 1964 Office building SIAE, viale dell'Arte at EUR; 1965, Palace at viale della Tecnica; 1968–69, Office building, in via Silvio d'Amico, (with his brother Ing. Pietro Monaco 1910-1997) the roof is designed by G. Capogrossi; Palace of Confindustria, in viale dell'Astronomia n.30, EUR district, realized with his son architect Edoardo Monaco, and the parking was designed by the artist Giuseppe Capogrossi; 1969–71, The Jolly Hotel building in Corso d'Italia beside Villa Borghese Park. Offices SLE-ICOR Rome-Eur. In Tunis, he realizes the Complex for Congresses and banquets "La Salle des Fêtes". In the 1960, the construction of furniture of the class of Ships SS Leonardo da Vinci (1960) and SS Michelangelo with preparation and supervision with Nino Zoncada and Giulio Carlo Argan, the works of many contemporary artists: Giuseppe Capogrossi, Cagli, Antonio Corpora Giulio Turcato, Giuseppe Santomaso, Roberto Aloi, Tranquillo Marangoni, Salvatore Fiume, Gino Severini, Emanuele Luzzati, Lojze Spacal.

Many of Monaco's works resulted from contests held during the Fascist age. Examples include the Politic-touristic-custom buildings (1937), Office of the Fascist Confederation of traders (1939), and the moving Bridge at Magliana (1940). He joined the competition E42 (EUR, Rome) for the Palazzo dei Congressi (1937–38) and other projects including the preparation for the "Mostra Augustea della Romanità" (1937.)

== Awards and honors ==
For his contributions to the modern architectural movement in Italy, particularly during the years of reconstruction after World War II, he was awarded the honor of Knight Grand Cross of the Order of Merit of the Italian Republic on 25 November 1968.

In 2015, he was honored with the painter Giuseppe Capogrossi as "Studio Monaco Luccichenti" at the MAXXI National Museum of XXI Century Arts in Rome, in the free permanent exhibition.

== Note ==
- ^ Official italian governative website of Quirinale Decorated detail in Italian language - Order of Merit of the Italian Republic
