= SS Raffaello =

Italian ocean liner of the 1960s

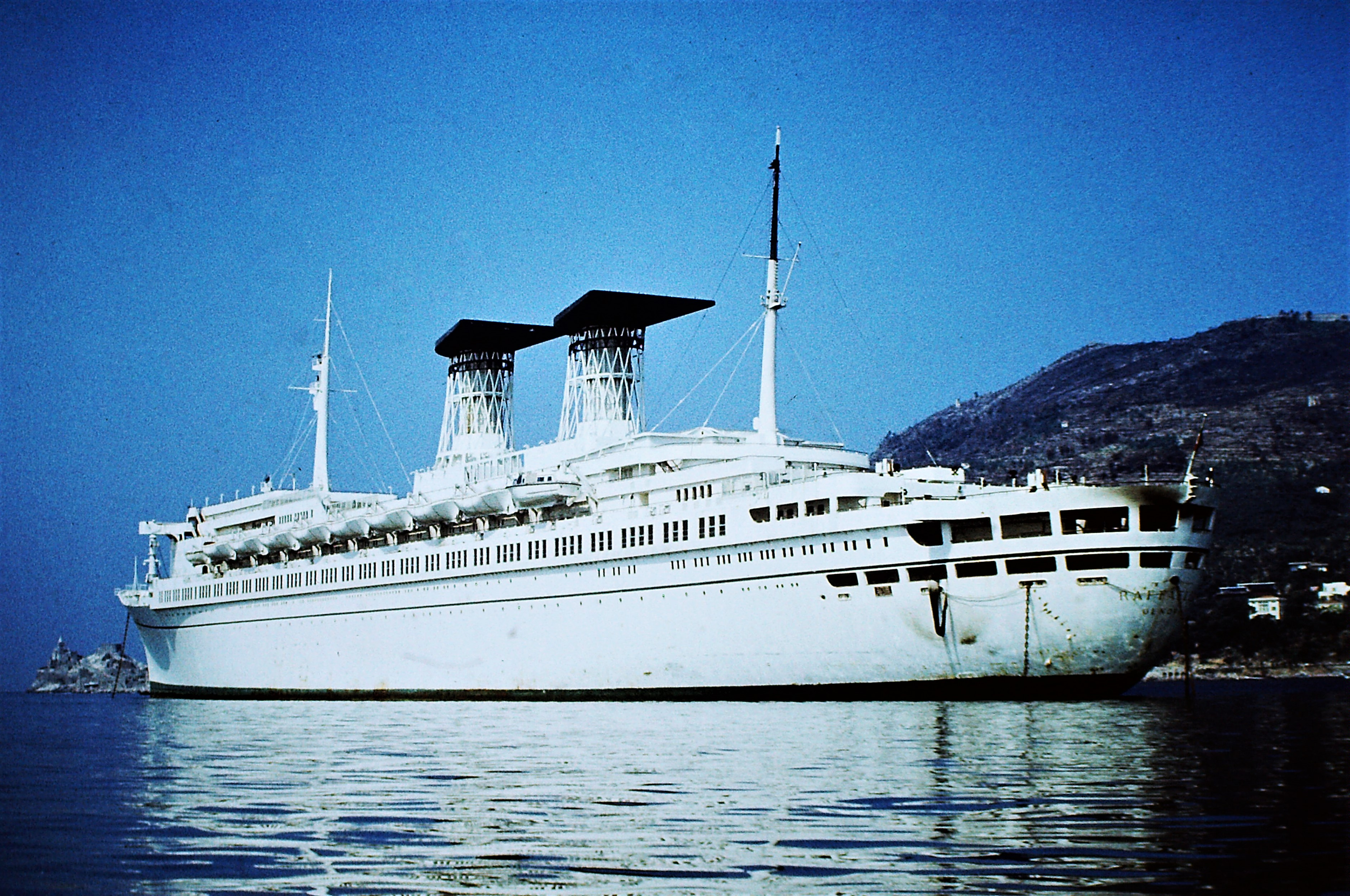
- SS Raffaello

History

Italy
- Name: Raffaello
- Namesake: Raphael
- Operator: Italia Società di Navigazione (Italian Line)
- Port of registry: Genoa, Italy
- Builder: Cantieri Riuniti dell' Adriatico, Trieste, Italy
- Yard number: 1578
- Launched: 24 March 1963
- Completed: July 1965
- Maiden voyage: (Cruise)10 July 1965, (Line service), 25 July 1965
- Out of service: 6 June 1975
- Identification: IMO number: 5289106
- Fate: Sold to Iran, 1977, where laid up

Iran
- Name: Rafael
- Acquired: 1976
- Home port: Bushehr
- Fate: Partially sunk 1983

General characteristics
- Type: Ocean liner
- Tonnage: 45,933 gross register tons (GRT)
- Length: 275.5 m (903 ft 10 in)
- Beam: 30.20 m (99 ft 1 in)
- Draught: 10.40 m (34 ft 1 in)
- Installed power: 87,000 shp (65,000 kW)
- Propulsion: Geared turbines, twin screw
- Speed: (Service) 26.5 knots (49.08 km/h; 30.50 mph) Max trial, 30.5 knots (56.49 km/h; 35.10 mph)
- Capacity: 1,775 passengers; (535 1st Class; 550 Cabin Class; 690 Tourist Class)
- Crew: 720
- Notes: Sister ship to SS Michelangelo

SS Raffaello was an Italian ocean liner built in the early 1960s for Italian Line by the Cantieri Riuniti dell'Adriatico, Trieste. She was one of the last ships to be built primarily for liner service across the North Atlantic. Her sister ship was SS Michelangelo.

== Design and construction ==
In 1958, the Italian Line began planning new ships to replace the ageing Saturnia and Vulcania. Competition from jet airliners had not yet had a huge impact in the Mediterranean area and jobs were needed for Italian sailors and shipyard workers, so constructing new superliners seemed like an attractive idea to Italian Line executives. Consequently, the new ships grew from the originally planned 35,000 tons to nearly 46,000 tons. They were the largest ships built in Italy since SS Rex and SS Conte di Savoia in the 1930s.

The Italian Line planned the ships as true ocean liners, divided into three classes. Oddly even for a liner, all cabins below A-deck were windowless, but on the technical side the ships were among the most advanced of their time. They featured retractable stabiliser wings, highly modernised engineering panels, and many other advantages. The funnels, in particular, were especially designed to keep smoke and soot from the rear decks. The funnel design proved to be highly effective, and it is a testament to their design that most funnels in modern passenger ships are built along similar principles.

Raffaello's interiors were designed by architects such as Michele and Giancarlo Busiri Vici, who had not worked on liner interiors before. As a result, Raffaello gained highly futuristic, more distinctive, but more sterile interiors than the Michelangelo. Despite being planned as identical ships, Raffaello was 0.7 meters (2.3 feet) shorter, 0.40 meters (1.3 feet) wider, and approximately 22 tons larger than the Michelangelo.

== Service ==
It took five years to finish Raffaello, a long time even by the standards of the day. The ship was further delayed when stern vibrations were discovered during the first sea trials. The ship's propellers and transmission system were modified to eliminate the vibrations. The modifications were successful and the ship was finally ready for service in July 1965. Senior Captain Oscar Ribari commanded the ship on its maiden voyage. The passengers included the Italian Senate-president Cesare Merzagora and his wife, the ship's godmother.

In 1966 Raffaello carried two Spider 1600 cars bound for an exhibition in the United States. The cars were even driven on the ship's first-class lido decks, a first for an ocean liner. 1969 saw Raffaello perform in the Italian film Amore mio aiutami, made in part to promote the two ships (despite the film officially being set on board Raffaello, it was filmed onboard both ships). In 1970 Raffaello became the first ship whose theatre stage was converted into a skating rink and skating shows were performed for passengers. In 1970 the ship suffered the most serious accident of its career when, under command of Senior Captain Luigi Oneto, it collided with a Norwegian oil tanker off the south coast of Spain in May 1970. There were no deaths.

Although Raffaello was the larger of the two ships, and its interiors more distinctive, she was always the less important ship in the eyes of Italian Line executives. As a result, when the transatlantic traffic started declining due to competition from air traffic, Raffaello was sent cruising in order to make more money while Michelangelo was used strictly for crossings. Raffaello was not very well suited for cruising. Although it did have a large amount of open deck space, the ship was too large, its cabins too small, and most of them too spartan for demanding cruise passengers.

== Sale to Iran ==
The Italian Line decided to withdraw Raffaello in April 1975, after the Italian Government announced that it would not further subsidize the ship (by 1975, it was paying 100 million lire per day, or about $151,500 at the then-current exchange rate, to keep it sailing). Initially laid up in Genoa and later in La Spezia near the scrapyard, Raffaello and Michelangelo were inspected by several potential buyers such as Norwegian Cruise Line, Costa Amatori, Chandris Group, and Home Lines. The last even made a serious offer to buy the ships, despite large rebuilding costs, but the Italia Line rejected the offer.

In 1976 the Shah of Iran emerged as a buyer the Italian Line could accept. The former flagships of Italy that had cost a total of $90 million in 1965, were sold for $4 million a decade later. Raffaello made its final journey late in the same year from La Spezia into Bushehr, where it served as a floating barracks for the next seven years.

In 1978 plans emerged to resurrect Michelangelo and Raffaello as cruise ships. Raffaello would have become Ciro il Grande (named after ancient Achaemenid ruler Cyrus the Great), a luxury cruiser accommodating 1,300 passengers. But Italian specialists sent to evaluate the ships' condition realized the ships were too decrepit to make reconstruction financially viable. As a result, Raffaello stayed in its moorings. The ship was heavily damaged and looted during the Iranian Islamic Revolution in 1979.

In 1983 plans were again made to bring Raffaello and Michelangelo back into service as cruise ships. But Raffaello had been hit by a missile during the Iran–Iraq War in 1983 and partially sank in shallow waters outside Bushehr. Sometime later the wreck was rammed by an Iranian cargo ship. Local divers further looted the hull in subsequent years.

As of 2006, Raffaello's hull remained partially submerged, and there have been reports of plans to scrap the ship completely. These plans were refuted by the Department of Environment as the ship has become part of the ecosystem. At least one of Raffaello's propellers was removed illegally and taken to Isfahan. One source indicates that it is not visible from the surface, but its position (28°49′0.24″N 50°52′36.58″E) is marked by warning buoys.
