= Funnel (ship) =

Ship structure for expelling exhaust gases

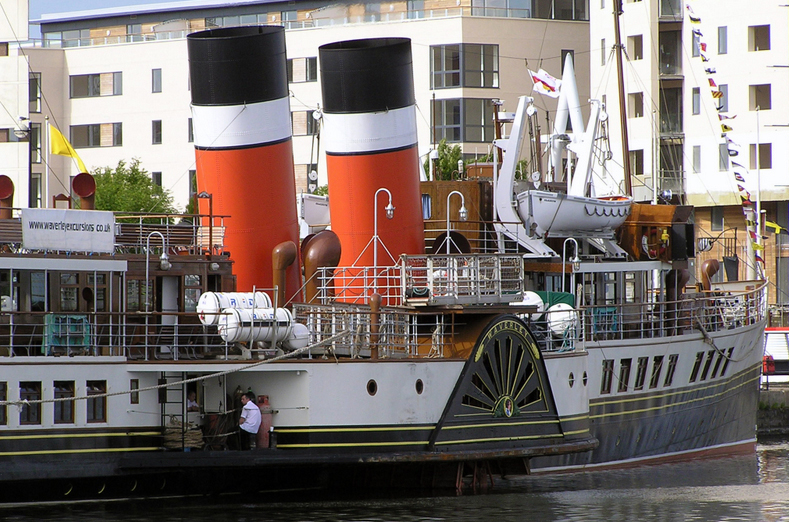
Twin funnels of PS Waverley

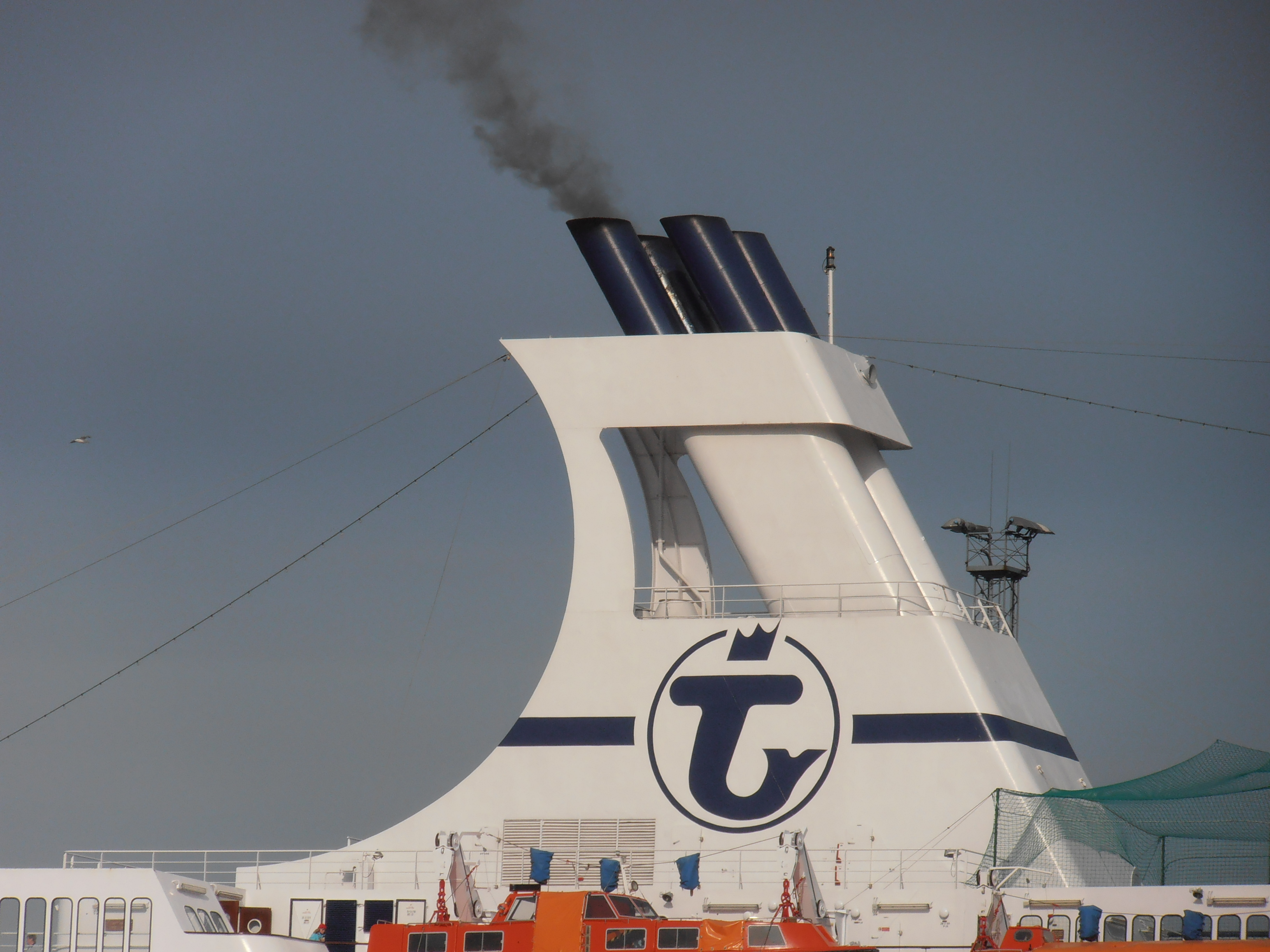
Diesel exhausts through the funnel of a modern cruise ship, MS Astor

A funnel is the smokestack or chimney on a ship used to expel boiler steam and smoke or engine exhaust. They are also commonly referred to as stacks.

== Purpose ==
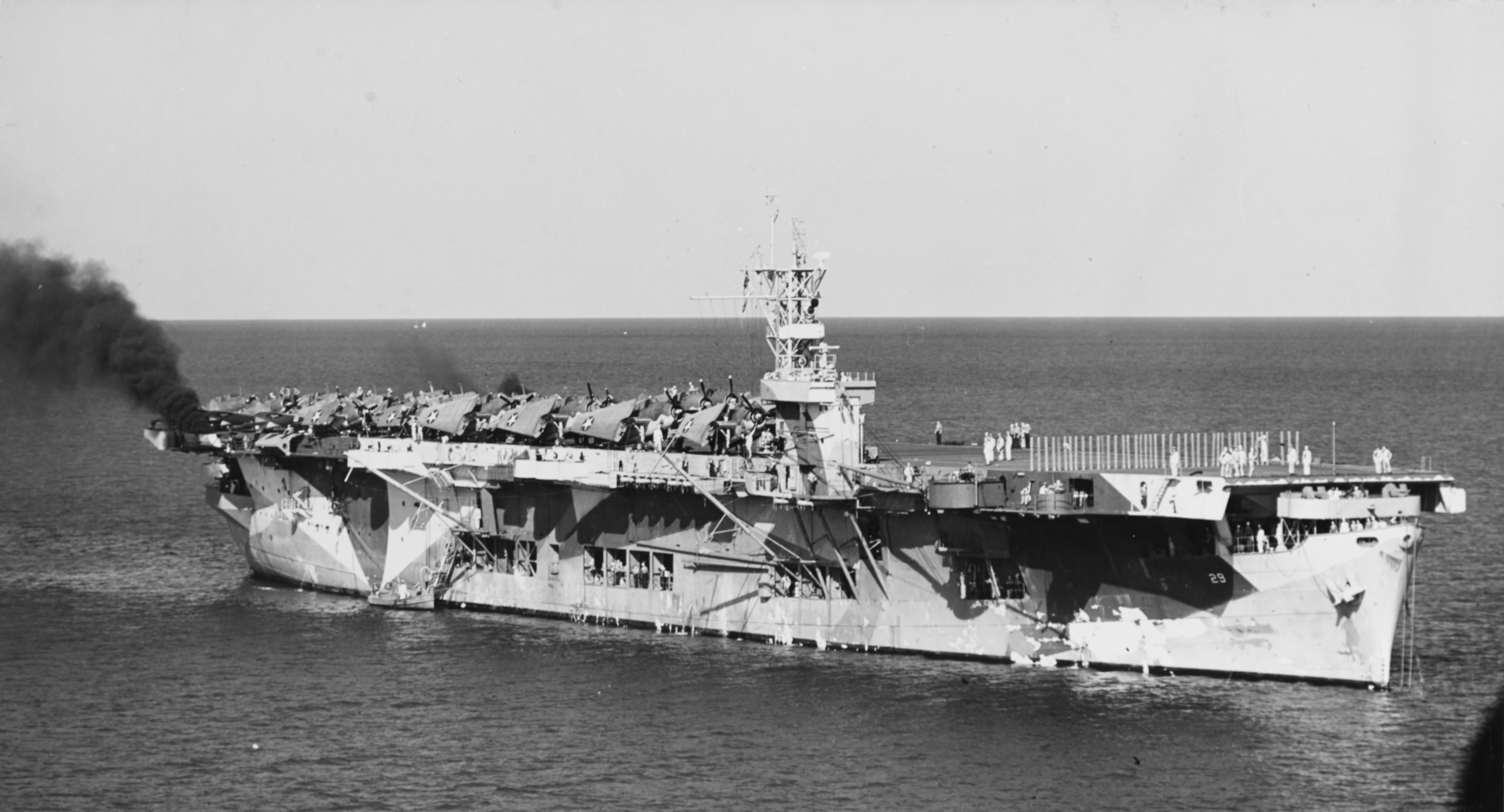
While at anchor, a ship blows soot, dust and debris out of its funnels.

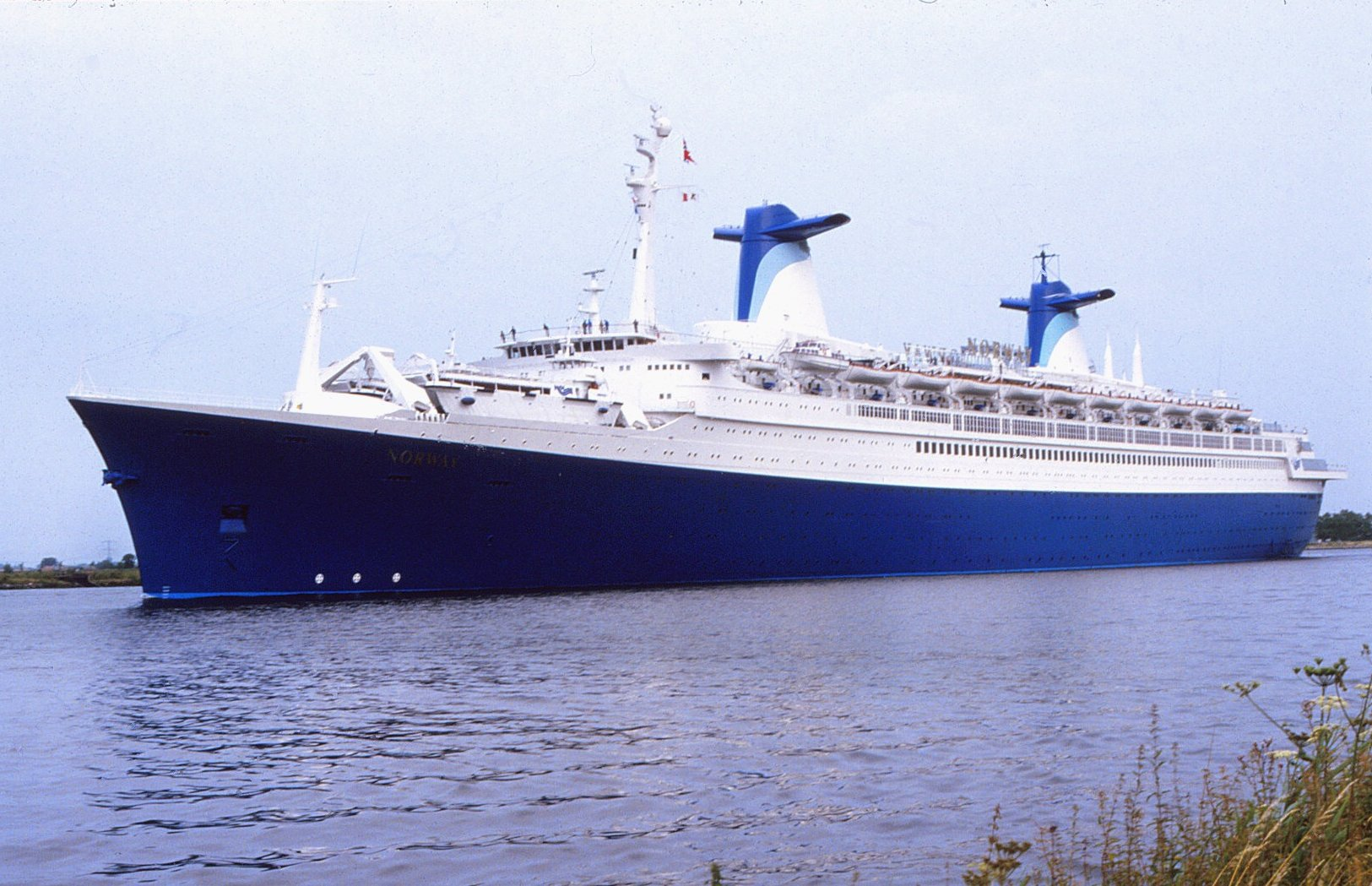
SS France (1960) (as SS Norway) and her distinctive wings, to increase uplift on the funnel's exhaust

The primary purpose of a ship's funnel(s) is to lift the exhaust gases clear of the deck, in order not to foul the ship's structure or decks, and to avoid impairing the ability of the crew to carry out their duties.

In steam ships the funnels also served to help induce a convection draught through the boilers.

== Design ==
Since the introduction of steam-power to ships in the 19th century, the funnel has been a distinctive feature of the silhouette of a vessel, and used for recognition purposes.

=== Funnel area ===
The required funnel cross-sectional area is determined by the volume of exhaust gases produced by the propulsion plant. Often this area is too great for a single funnel. Early steam vessels needed multiple funnels (SS Great Eastern had 5 when launched), but as efficiency increased new machinery needed fewer funnels.

== Merchant ships ==
Merchant shipping companies (and particularly liner companies such as Cunard and ferries such as Red Funnel) were quick to recognise the publicity value of distinctive funnels, both in terms of shape, number of funnels, and the colours they were painted. In an era when ship hulls were uniformly painted black (to conceal inevitable dirt when loading the ship with coal) and superstructures were white (to control the temperature in the passenger accommodation in hot summers) the funnel was one of the few parts of the ship that a company could use to clearly differentiate its ships from those of its competitors. Each company would have their own "house colours", which were often used in publicity material as well as for recognition, making funnel colours an early form of trademark. Some companies became so closely associated with their funnel colours that their nickname became a de facto company name. For example, the shipping line actually registered as 'Alfred Holt & Company' was more widely known as the Blue Funnel Line. The Southampton, Isle of Wight and South of England Royal Mail Steam Packet Company has traded under the name Red Funnel for most of its 150+ year history. Other colours such as the red with black stripes of Cunard and the all buff colour of P&O remain icons of their respective lines and have remained in use for over a century through many changes of corporate ownership.

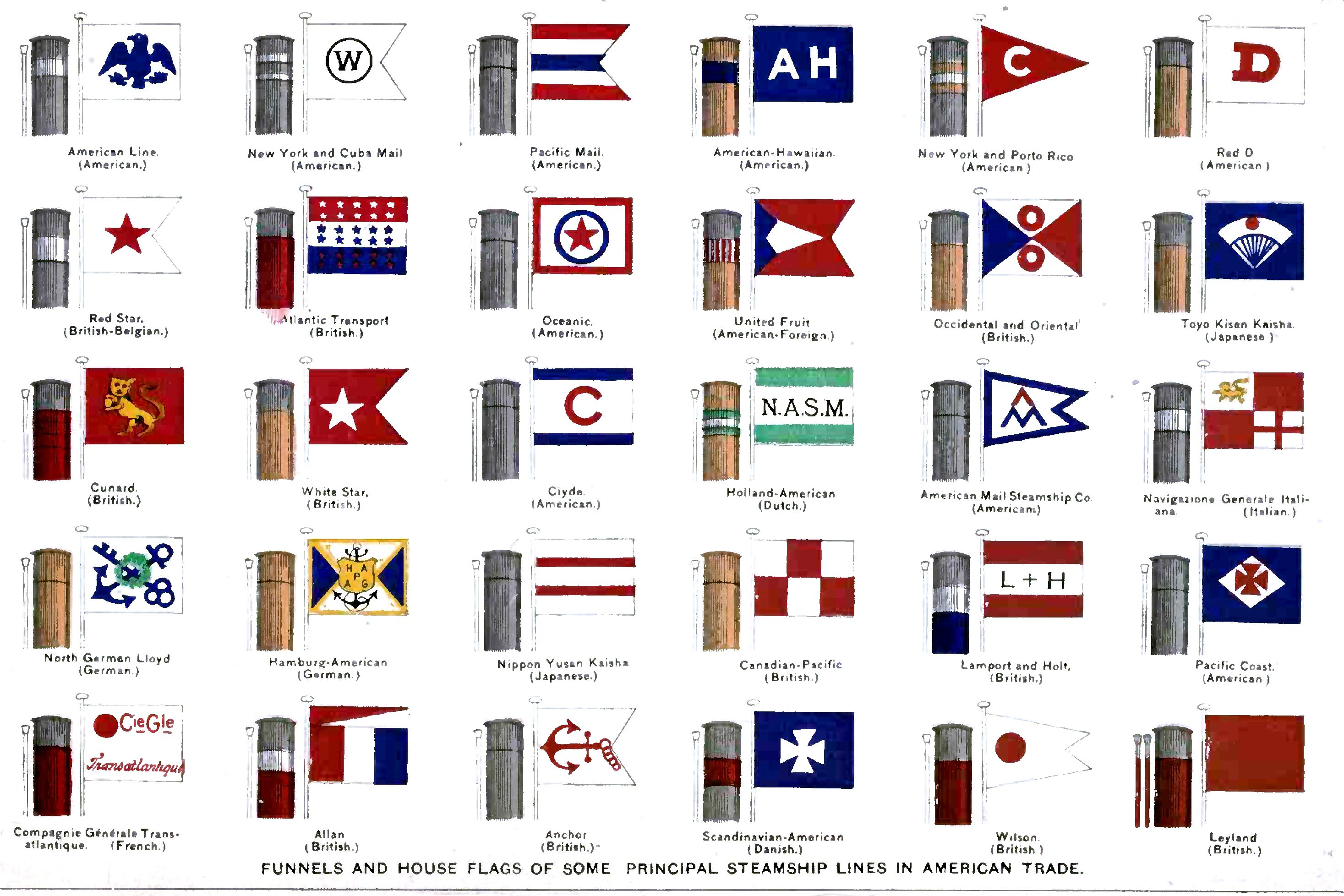
Merchant shipping lines often painted their ships' funnels in distinctive colours to distinguish them from competitors. Here a selection of company house flags are shown with their associated funnel patterns (circa 1900).

Sometimes the shape of the funnel is used as distinguishing feature rather than just the colour. Cunard fitted ships of its Saxonia class with streamlined round tops to the funnels. Intended as an aerodynamic aid to keep exhaust clear of the deck the modification had very little practical effect but was retained because it made the four ships of the class immediately recognisable and gave Cunard a suitable modern image. There was a trend for 'designer funnels' on liners in the 1960s as fashion and aerodynamic advances combined to offer designers more options that the traditional cylindrical smokestack. The Italian Line fitted the liners Michelangelo and Raffaello with funnels topped by flat discs supported on exposed diagonal bracing while P&O's Oriana and Canberra had tall, thin funnels with aerofoil cross sections.

In the late 19th and the first half of the 20th century the number of funnels became associated with speed and reliability. For this reason a number of the great liners carried additional false funnels that they did not need. Examples included the White Star Line's RMS Titanic, Hamburg America Line's SS Imperator, and later the French Line's SS Normandie. In most cases there was only a single false funnel placed as the aftermost of the funnels. The false funnels did have more uses than simply aiding aesthetics however - a stoker who survived the sinking of the Titanic escaped the boiler room by ascending the false funnel, the aft funnel of Normandie housed the passengers' dog kennels, and Disney Cruise Line's Disney Magic's forward funnel plays host to a teens-only club.

== Naval ships ==
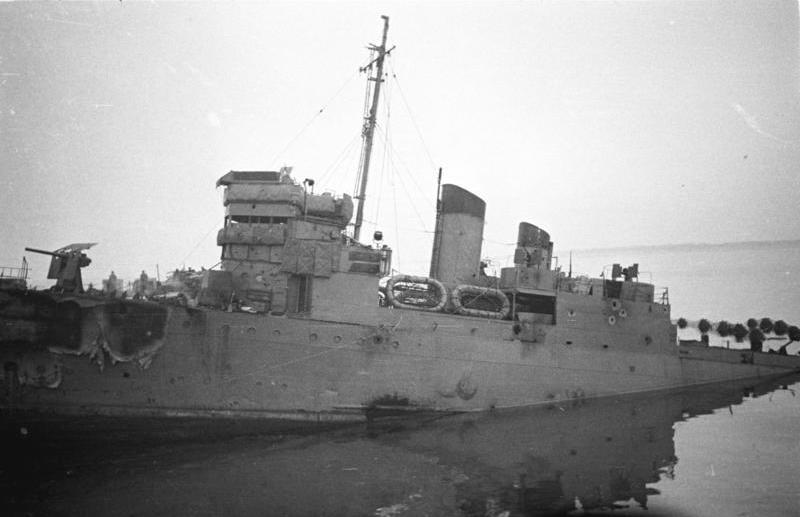
HMS Campbeltown with her four funnels reduced to two with angled caps, in order to resemble a German Type 23 torpedo boat.

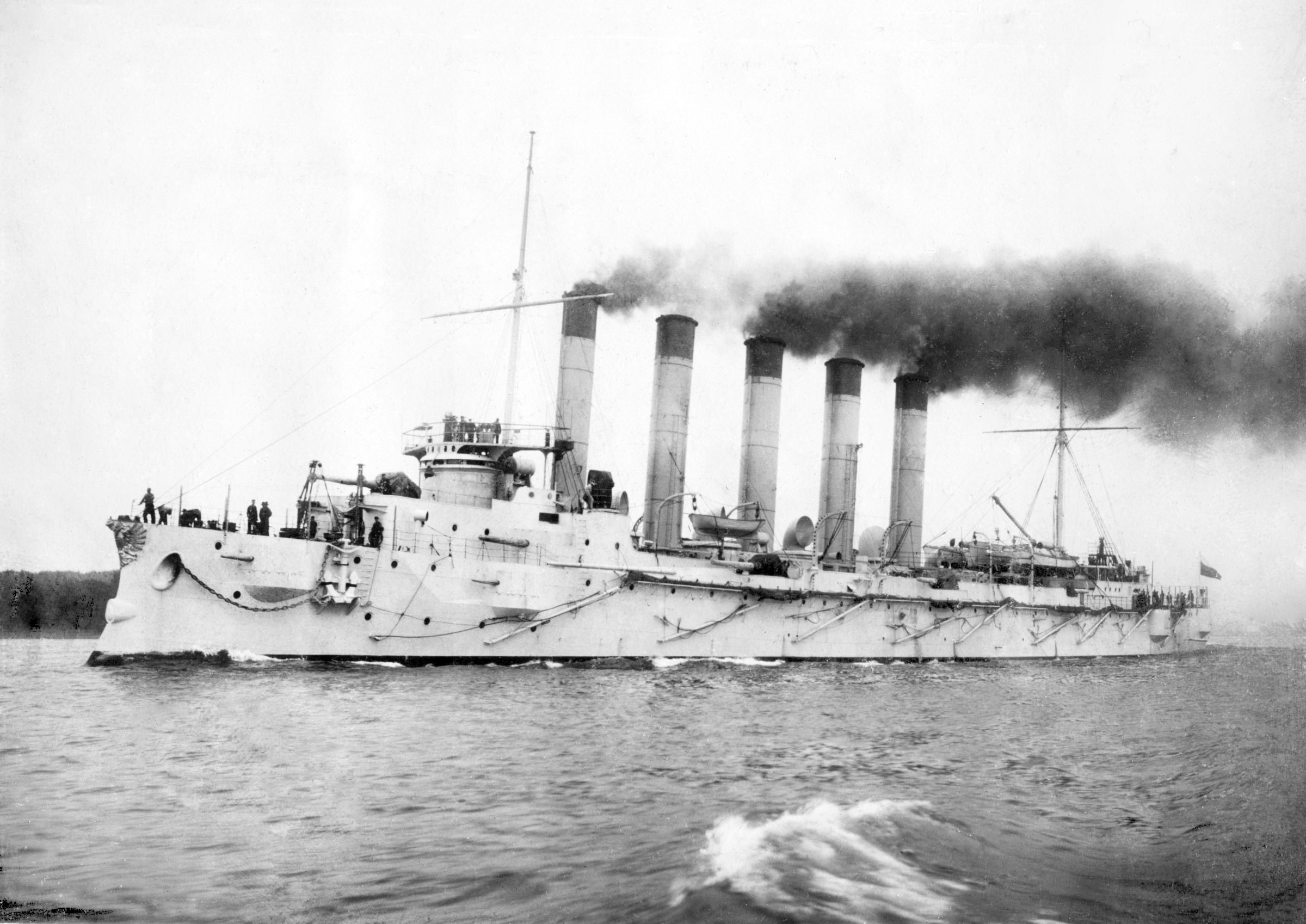
The quintuple-funneled Russian cruiser Askold in 1901

A key part of the deception practiced by ships carrying out commerce raiding during both the First World War and Second World War was to disguise their ship's outline, and this included using false funnels or by changing the height or diameter of the actual funnel(s).

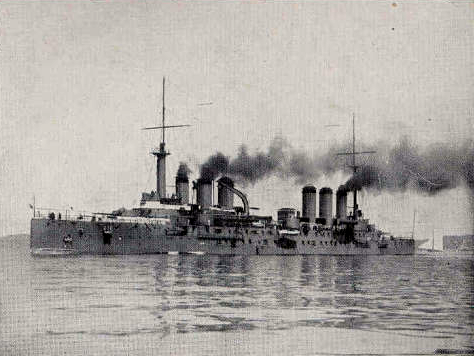
The six-funneled armored cruiser Edgar Quinet, 1913

Five naval ships with six funnels each were constructed in the late 19th and early 20th centuries: two Italia-class ironclad battleships operated by the Italian Navy from 1885 to 1921, the French armored cruiser Ernest Renan, and the two Edgar Quinet-class armored cruisers operated by the French Navy from 1911 to 1932. Both had their funnels in two groups of three before and abaft of center.

=== Macks ===
A mack is a combined stack and mast, as fitted to some classes of 20th century warships. Although they can reduce top-weight, they have not gained universal popularity due to the problem of exhaust gases corroding electrical aerials and equipment.
