= SS Leonardo da Vinci =

A number of steamships have been named Leonardo da Vinci, including:

- SS Leonardo da Vinci (1924)
- SS Leonardo da Vinci (1958)
