= Italian Line =

Passenger shipping line (1932–2002)

- Founded: 1932
- Defunct: 2002
- Successor: CP Ships
- Headquarters: Genoa, Italy

Italian Line (from 1992 Italia Line, official name Italia di Navigazione S.p.A.), was a passenger shipping line that operated regular transatlantic services between Italy and the United States, and Italy and South America. During the late 1960s the company turned to running cruises, and from 1981 it became a global freight operator.

== History ==
House flag used by Italian Line

The company was founded in 1932 through a merger of the Genoa-based Navigazione Generale Italiana (NGI), the Turin-based Lloyd Sabaudo, and the Trieste-based Cosulich STN lines, encouraged by the Italian government. The new company acquired the Cosulich-owned ships Saturnia and Vulcania, the Lloyd Sabaudo-owned Conte Rosso, Conte Biancamano and Conte Grande and the NGI-owned Giulio Cesare, Duilio, Roma and Augustus. The same year two previously ordered ocean liners were delivered to the company: Rex, that won the Blue Riband in 1933, and Conte di Savoia.

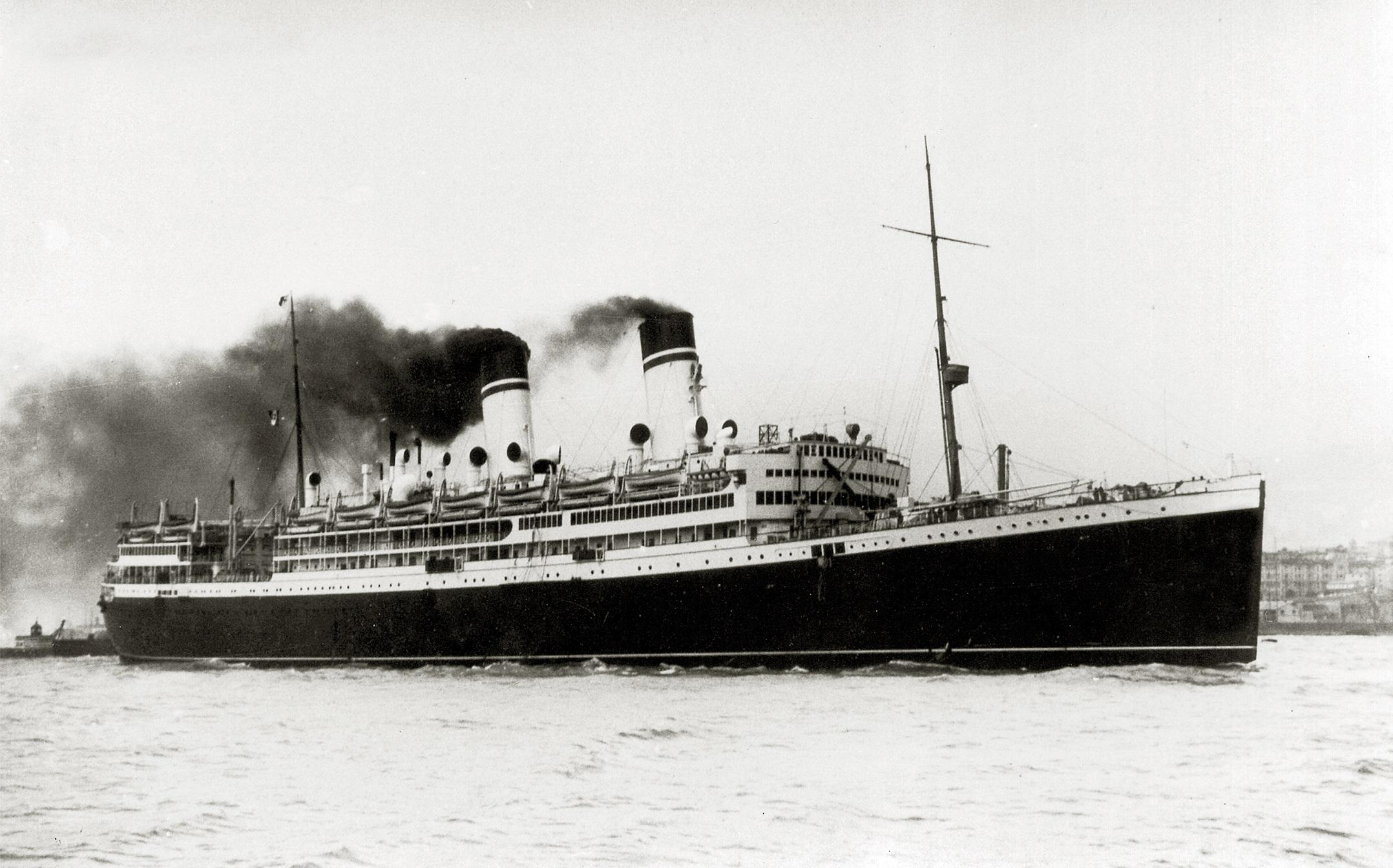
Giulio Cesare, built in 1923, in Italian Line service 1932–1937

In World War II the company lost many ships, including Rex and Conte di Savoia. Others were captured by the United States and converted into troopships; four of them survived the war: Conte Biancamano, Conte Grande, Saturnia, and Vulcania.

Commercial service was resumed in 1947 under the company's new name Società di navigazione Italia. In addition to the four vessels returned to the company by the United States, two new vessels, Andrea Doria and Cristoforo Colombo were commissioned in 1953 and 1954. In 1956, Andrea Doria, the company's three-year-old flagship collided with the Swedish ship Stockholm near Nantucket and sank, with passenger deaths estimated at 46 or 55. The company replaced Andrea Doria with Leonardo da Vinci, which went into service in 1960. This ship was based on the same design as Andrea Doria, but was larger, and featured technical innovations.

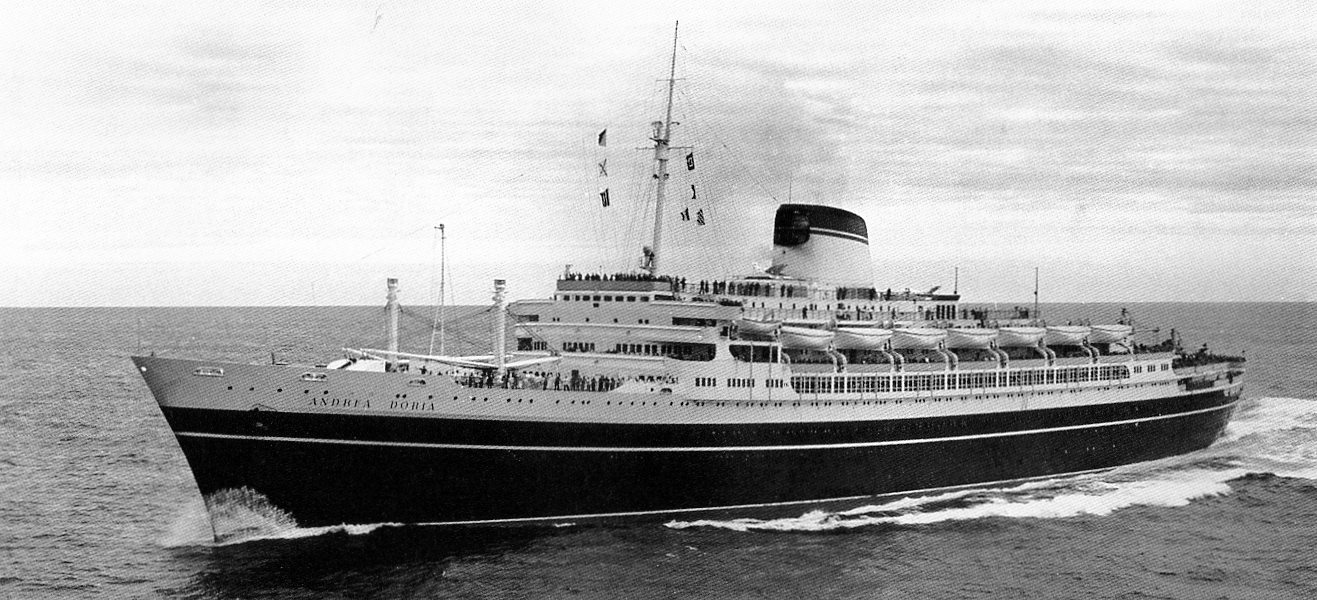
SS Andrea Doria

In the late 1950s aircraft passenger travel had yet to have a noticeable effect on ocean-going passenger numbers between the United States and the Mediterranean. The Italian Line, therefore, ordered two new ships: Michelangelo and Raffaello. Building the ships took longer than expected, and they were not delivered until 1965. Being late into service, they were unable to compete profitably on the North Atlantic route. Although planned for cruising as an alternative, the ships had several design flaws that made their use as cruise ships problematic.

Despite huge financial loss, the Italian Line operated the transatlantic route until 1976, after which the Leonardo da Vinci was withdrawn from service; the Michelangelo and Raffaello had been sold the previous year. The Cristoforo Colombo was also withdrawn from service at this time.

=== I.C.I. - Italia Crociere Internazionali ===
The Leonardo da Vinci became a cruise ship in 1977–78, after which it was withdrawn due to high fuel costs. In 1979 and 1980 the company operated two ex-Lloyd Triestino liners, Galileo Galilei and Guglielmo Marconi, as cruise ships, but this again proved unprofitable. The ship Ausonia was also charted for brief service under this line.

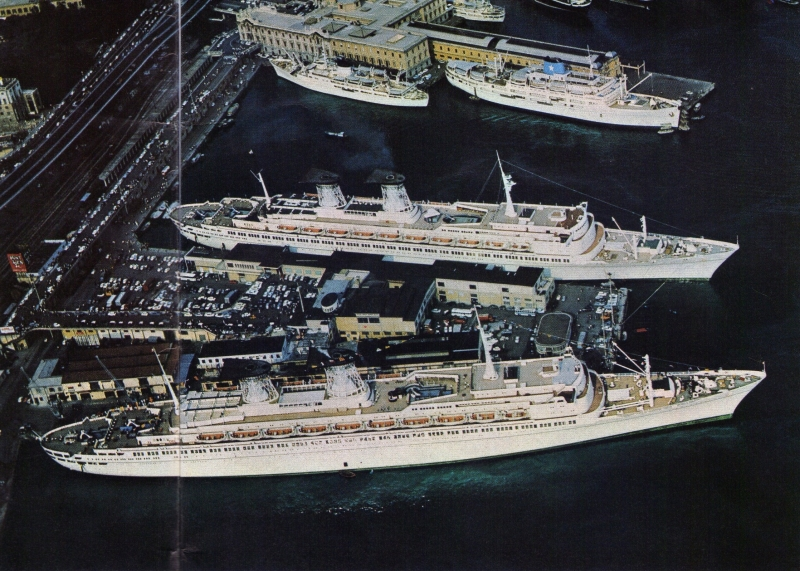
SS Raffaello & SS Michelangelo

Because of the unprofitability of the cruise business, the Italian Line turned to freight shipping. It operated its principal container services between the Mediterranean, the west coast of North America, and Central and South America, carrying about 180,000 twenty-foot equivalent units (TEU) of freight in 2001.

Previously owned by the Italian government, the company was privatized in 1998 when sold to an italian private owner. In August 2002, it was acquired by CP Ships, and in 2005 the Italian Line name ceased to exist following CP's one-brand strategy. CP Ships itself was bought-out in late 2005 by TUI AG, and merged with Hapag-Lloyd in mid-2006.

== Ships ==
=== Passenger ships ===
Image	Built	Name	Tonnage	Shipyard	Operated	Notes
	1908	SS Tel Aviv	8,312 GRT	Russell & Co., Scotland	1932–1934	Former Cosulich Line ship; scrapped 1934
	1917	SS Colombo	12,003 GRT	Palmer S&E Co Ltd, Jarrow on Tyne	1932–1941	Refurbished in passenger vessel by Cantieri Baia Napoli. Scuttled at Massaua, 3 April 1941
	1922	SS Giulio Cesare	21,848 GRT	Swan Hunter & Wigham Richardson, Ltd, UK	1932–1937	transferred to Lloyd Triestino
	1923	SS Conte Verde	18,765 GRT	William Beardmore & Co., Scotland	1932–1940	
	1923	SS Duilio	24,281 GRT	Ansaldo Shipyards, Italy	1932–1937	transferred to Lloyd Triestino, scrapped 1948
	1925	SS Conte Biancamano	24,416 GRT	William Beardmore & Co., Scotland	1932–1940; 1947–1960	
	1926	SS Roma	32,583 GRT	Ansaldo Shipyards, Italy	1932–1939	
	1926	MS Vulcania	23,970 GRT	Cantiere Navale Triestino, Italy	1932–1940; 1947–1965	sold to Siosa Lines
	1927	MS Saturnia	23,940 GRT	Cantiere Navale Triestino, Italy	1932–1940; 1946–1965	scrapped 1965
	1927	SS Conte Grande	25,661 GRT	Stabilimento Tecnico Triestino, Italy	1932–1940; 1947–1961	scrapped in 1961
	1927	SS Conte Rosso	18,017 GRT	William Beardmore & Co., Scotland	1932–1940	torpedoed and sunk by HMS Upholder, 24 May 1941
	1928	MS Augustus	32,650 GRT	Ansaldo Shipyards, Italy	1932–1939	largest diesel-engined liner of her time
	1932	SS Conte di Savoia	48,502 GRT	Cantieri Riuniti dell' Adriatico, Italy	1932–1940	scuttled in Venice by retreating German forces, 11 September 1943. Raised 1945 and scrapped.
	1932	SS Rex	51,062 GRT	Ansaldo Shipyards, Italy	1932–1940	bombed and sunk off Trieste by RAF and SAAF bombers, 8 September 1944
	1932	MS Neptunia	19,475 GRT	Cantieri Riuniti dell' Adriatico, Italy	1937–1940	torpedoed and sunk by HMS Upholder, 18 September 1941
	1932	MV Oceania	19,507 GRT	Cantieri Riuniti dell' Adriatico, Italy	1937–1940	torpedoed and sunk by HMS Upholder, 18 September 1941
	1951	MS Giulio Cesare	27,078 GRT	Cantieri Riuniti dell' Adriatico, Italy	1951–1973	scrapped 1973
	1951	MS Augustus	27,090 GRT	Cantieri Riuniti dell' Adriatico, Italy	1952–1976	scrapped 2012
	1951	SS Andrea Doria	29,083 GRT	Ansaldo Shipyards, Italy	1953–1956	capsized and sank on 25 July 1956 after colliding with MS Stockholm
	1953	SS Cristoforo Colombo	29,191 GRT	Ansaldo Shipyards, Italy	1954–1977	scrapped 1982 in Kaohsiung, Taiwan
	1960	SS Leonardo da Vinci	33,340 GRT	Ansaldo Shipyards, Italy	1960–1980	burned and capsized 4 July 1980, raised and scrapped 1982
	1951	MS Rossini	13,225 GRT	Cantieri Riuniti dell' Adriatico - San Marco Trieste, Italy	1963	scrapped 1977
	1951	MS Donizetti	13,226 GRT	Cantieri Riuniti dell' Adriatico - San Marco Trieste, Italy	1963	scrapped 1977
	1951	MS Verdi	13,226 GRT	Cantieri Riuniti dell' Adriatico - San Marco Trieste, Italy	1963	scrapped 1977
	1965	SS Michelangelo	45,911 GRT	Ansaldo Shipyards, Italy	1965–1975	scrapped 1991
	1965	SS Raffaello	45,933 GRT	Cantieri Riuniti dell' Adriatico, Trieste, Italy	1965–1975	sunk 1983

=== Container ships ===
Built	Name	Tonnage	Capacity	Shipyard	IMO number	Call sign	Flag	Status/Comments
1985	Aquitania	17702 GT	1077 TEU	Stocznia Szczecinska S.A., Poland	8300975	HPUE	Panama	1991 chartered, 1993 purchased from Cyprus
1989	Cristoforo Colombo	32630 GT	3632 TEU	Fincantieri-Cantieri Navali Italiani S.p.A., Italy	8618449	ICYS	Italy	2002 to d'Amico shipping Italia
1989	Amerigo Vespucci	32630 GT	3632 TEU	Fincantieri-Cantieri Navali Italiani S.p.A., Italy	8618451	ICBA	Italy	2002 to d'Amico shipping Italia
1991	S. Caboto	15783 GT	1268 TEU	Fincantieri-Cantieri Navali Italiani S.p.A., Italy	8618413	ICMS	Italy	2002 to d'Amico shipping Italia
1992	California	17123 GT	1410 TEU	Naikai Zosen Corp., Japan	8901743	ICFC	Italy	2002 to d'Amico shipping Italia
1994	Cielo del Cile	15778 GT	1512 TEU	Thyssen Nordseewerke GmbH, Germany	9046253	ELVB3	Liberia	2002 to d'Amico shipping Italia
1997	Dollart Trader	16165 GT	1608 TEU	MTW Schiffswerft GmbH, Germany	9162356	V2OD5	Antigua & Barbuda	2002 to d'Amico shipping Italia
1998	Cielo di San Francisco	25359 GT	2474 TEU	Volkswerft Stralsund GmbH, Germany	9153408	DGZO	Germany	2002 to d'Amico shipping Italia
1998	Cielo del Canada	25361 GT	2470 TEU	Meeres-Technik-Wismar, Germany	9138290	V2PE2	Antigua & Barbuda	2002 to d'Amico shipping Italia
2000	Cielo del Caribe	13066 GT	1302 TEU	Flensburger Schiffbau-Gesellschaft MbH & Co. KG, Germany	9202053	ELXN2	Liberia	2002 to d'Amico shipping Italia
2002	Cielo d'America	25580 GT	2462 TEU	Thyssen Nordseewerke GmbH, Germany	9239733	ICCV	Italy	2002 to d'Amico shipping Italia
2002	Cielo d'Europa	25535 GT	2462 TEU	Thyssen Nordseewerke GmbH, Germany	9236664	ICCP	Italy	2002 to d'Amico shipping Italia

- GRT = gross register tonnage
- GT = gross tonnage
