= MS Vulcania =

Italian ocean liner (1926–1974)

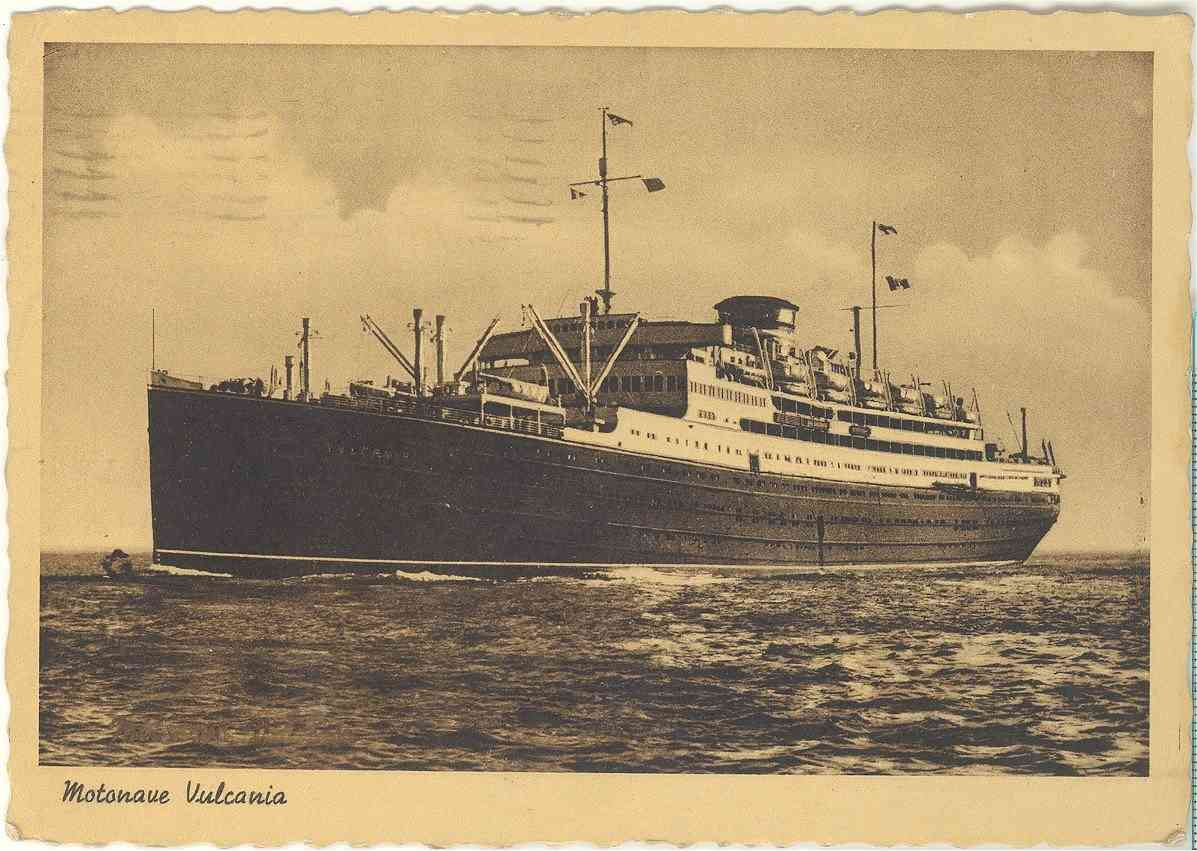

History

Italy
- Name: Vulcania
- Owner: Cosulich Line
- Port of registry: Italy, Trieste
- Route: Trieste – Naples – New York City – Trieste
- Builder: Cantiere Navale Triestino, Monfalcone, Italy
- Yard number: 161
- Laid down: 30 January 1926
- Launched: 18 December 1926
- Completed: 2 December 1928
- In service: 1929–1974
- Out of service: 1974
- Fate: Sunk on way to scrappers, 1974

General characteristics
- Type: Ocean liner
- Length: 192.92 m (632 ft 11 in)
- Beam: 24.3 m (79 ft 9 in)
- Propulsion: 25,000 hp (19,000 kW) diesel engine
- Sail plan: Two masts
- Speed: 19 knots (35 km/h; 22 mph)
- Capacity: 1,760 passengers

MS Vulcania was an Italian ocean liner built by Cantiere Navale Triestino, Monfalcone, northern Italy, in 1926 for the Italian company, Cosulich Line.

== Characteristics ==
Vulcania is considered one of the most successful passenger ships ever built. During her career she carried more passengers than any other Italian-flagged ship. Like her twin sister Saturnia, she was designed by Niccolò Costanzi, the director of the Cantiere Navale Triestino, and represented a great novelty in the conservative field of naval architecture.

She was measured at 23,970 gross register tons (GRT), with an overall length of 192.92 metres (632 ft 11 in) and a breadth of 24.23 m (79 ft 6 in). She had one funnel, two masts, twin screws and could reach a maximum speed of 19 knots (35 km/h; 22 mph). There was accommodation for 310 First, 460 Second, 310 intermediate and 700 3rd class passengers. In 1930 her accommodation was altered to 1st, 2nd, tourist and 3rd class, and in 1962 to 1st, tourist and 3rd class only. In 1930 she was fitted with two new Burmeister & Wain diesel engines a maximum speed of 21 knots (39 km/h; 24 mph). Later she was rebuilt to a tonnage of 24,469 tons.

Although there had been various ships which offered private verandahs and promenades for the suites, Vulcania and Saturnia were the first liners to offer a large number of cabins with private balconies. Casa Artistica was responsible for designing the interior of the ship, in conservative classical style, with contributions from Austrian and British design firms. with works of art like Le Sirene, a 1934 wooden bas-relief by renowned artist Marcello Mascherini, displayed in the tourist-class bar.

The ship was powered by one of the largest two stroke diesel engines of its time. Its cylinders were of the double-acting type, in which combustion takes place both above and below the piston. This required the use of a crosshead.

== History ==
Launched on 18 December 1926, she sailed from Trieste on her maiden voyage to Patras, Naples and New York City on 19 December 1928. On 1 January 1932, Vulcania was acquired by the newly formed Italia Flotte Reunite, founded through a merger encouraged by the Italian government of the Genoa-based Navigazione Generale Italiana (NGI), the Turin-based Lloyd Sabaudo, and the Trieste-based Cosulich STN lines.

In September 1933, she transported the body of the Italian aviator Francesco de Pinedo to Italy from New York City after his death in a plane crash. In the inter-war years, Vulcania made many transatlantic routes between the Adriatic and Mediterranean ports and the Americas. In 1933, she stopped many times at Haifa and Palestine. Commandeered by the Italian government, Vulcania's wartime service began with special trooping duties during the Second Italo-Ethiopian War in 1935. From 18 February, she made eight voyages sailing between Naples – Massawa – Mogadishu carrying troops and colonists. On 12 May, she was given new engines and renovated at the shipyard in Monfalcone to soon resume her transatlantic sailings until the Kingdom of Italy entered World War II on 10 June 1940.

In December 1936 she commenced her last Trieste-New York voyage for Cosulich. When Italia was liquidated in 1937, Cosulich was absorbed into the replacement Italia Societa Anonima di Navigazione. In 1940, Vulcania made her last run from Trieste to New York for Italia Line.

On 27 April 1940, before Italy entered the war, she was given the southbound run and made her inaugural voyage to South America from Trieste to Buenos Aires, carrying a number of immigrants from Europe to Brazil and Argentina. She stopped in Split, Naples, Genoa, Barcelona, Gibraltar, Lisbon, Funchal, Salvador, Rio de Janeiro, Santos. In Gibraltar, the ship was detained for six hours on 6 May by the Allied Forces Port Authorities, who removed 1,750 postal bags originating from Germany and handed back about 1,000 mailing bags previously apprehended on Oceania and duly examined. The ship landed at Rio de Janeiro on 16 May 1940. According to the board report issued by Captain Nestore Martinelli, she was carrying 1,015 passengers, 336 of which came ashore. Among the first class passengers, there were the new Belgian Ambassador in Rio de Janeiro, Mr. Maurice Cuvalier, the new Italian consul in Belo Horizonte, Tranquillo Bianco, and the secretary for the Dutch legation in Rio, Jonkheer H.M. von der Wijck. In transit to Buenos Aires, continued Count and Countess Pavoncelli, maestro Franco Ghione and seven lyrical singers: Galliano Masini, Bruno Landi, Armando Borgioli, Filippo Romito, Giacomo Vaghi and Duiliu Baroni, who were to give a performance at the Teatro Colón. The ship managed to return to Europe in the first days of June from Buenos Aires, via Montevideo, Rio de Janeiro and Salvador, evading British vigilance vessels, which had been ordered to detain her.

The Italian government requisitioned Vulcania in 1941 to carry troops to North Africa. In March 1942 she was used on three special missions to repatriate women and children to Genoa from East Africa via South Africa under the aegis of the International Red Cross via Gibraltar, Cape Verde Islands, Port Elizabeth. On 17 September 1943, she was commandeered by the German Navy, then laid up in Venice. In October 1945 she became a United States troopship, repatriating American troops from Naples to New York.

=== Postwar ===
On 29 March 1946, she was chartered to American Export Lines to run between New York – Naples – Alexandria. After six round voyages, she commenced her last voyage on this service on 4 October 1946 and was returned to the Italia Line on 15 November of the same year. She then sailed New York – Naples – Genoa, where she was reconditioned to carry 240–1st, 270-cabin and 860-tourist class passengers. In July 1947 she made another voyage from Genoa to South America and then, on 4 September 1947, resumed the Genoa – Naples – New York service. On 21 September 1955 she commenced her last voyage on this run and on 28 October of the same year was transferred to run between Trieste, Venice, Patras, Naples, Palermo, Barcelona, Gibraltar, Lisbon, Halifax and New York. On 5 April 1965 she commenced her last voyage on this service. She was sold to the Sicula Oceanica S.p.A. / Grimaldi SIOSA Line, renamed Caribia and then ran as an immigrant ship between Southampton, Vigo, and Lisbon, and various Caribbean islands, before being put into Mediterranean cruise service.

She hit a rock off Cannes in 1972, was damaged and was laid up at La Spezia. She arrived at Barcelona on 18 September 1973 under tow to be demolished but was resold to a Taiwanese demolition company and departed under tow to Kaohsiung for scrapping on 15 March the following year. However, she sank at the bay before reaching the destination.
