= SS Michelangelo =

Italian ocean liner

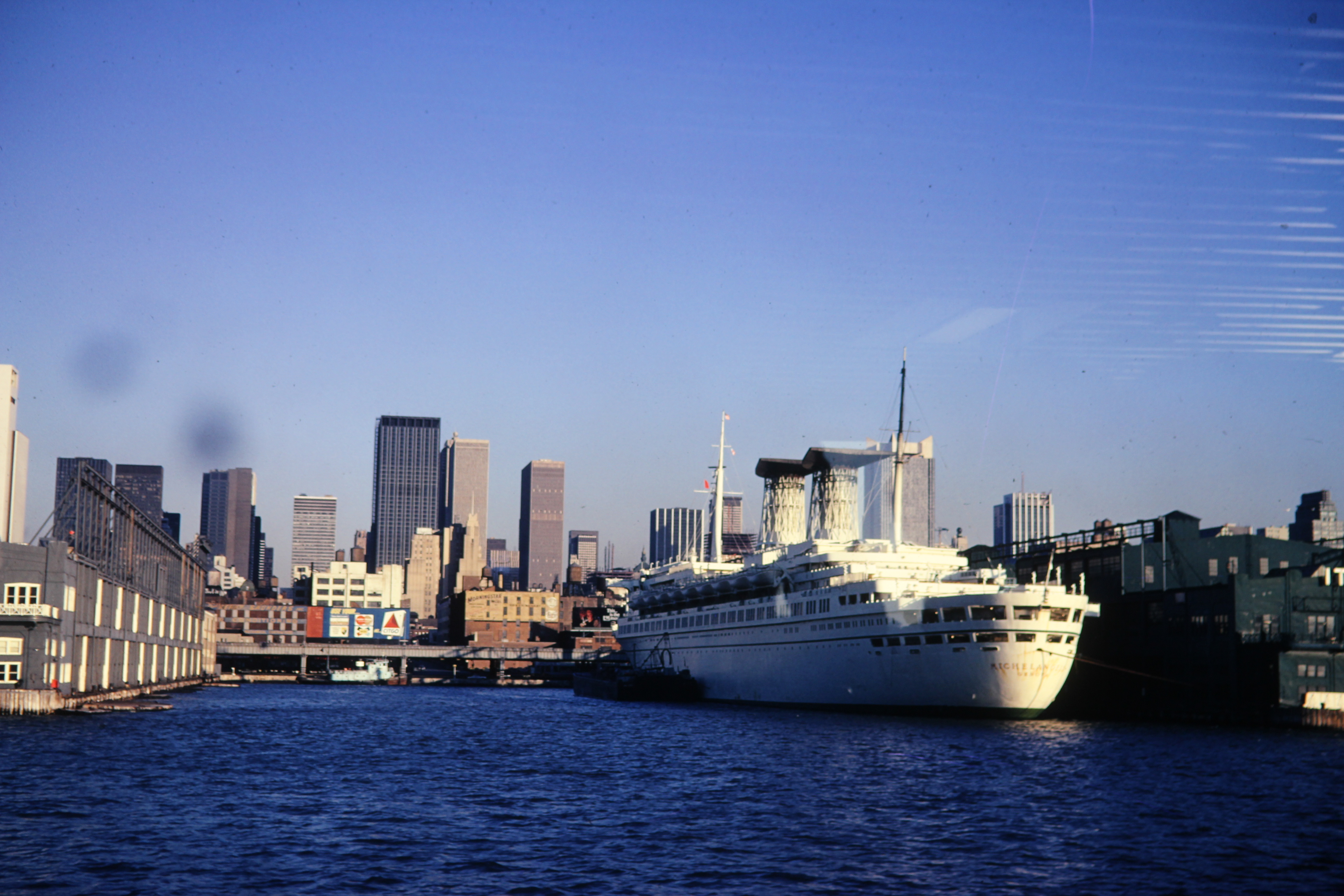
- SS Michelangelo docked in New York City, November 1971.

History

Italy
- Name: Michelangelo
- Namesake: Michelangelo Buonarroti
- Operator: Italia Societa di Navigazione (Italian Line)
- Port of registry: Genoa, Italy
- Builder: Ansaldo Shipyards, Genoa, Italy
- Yard number: 1577
- Launched: 16 September 1962
- Completed: April 1965
- Maiden voyage: 12 May 1965
- Out of service: 5 July 1975
- Identification: IMO number: 5234113
- Fate: Sold to Iran, 1977

History

Iran
- Name: Michel-Ange
- Acquired: 1976
- Home port: Bandar Abbas
- Fate: Scrapped in 1991

General characteristics
- Type: Ocean liner;
- Tonnage: 45,911 GRT; 9,192 tonnes deadweight (DWT)
- Length: 276.2 m (906 ft 2 in)
- Beam: Moulded 30.1 m (98 ft 9 in)
- Draught: 10.40 m (34 ft 1 in)
- Installed power: 87,000 shp (65,000 kW)
- Propulsion: Geared turbines from builders, twin screw
- Speed: 26.5 kn (49.08 km/h; 30.50 mph)
- Capacity: 1,775 passengers; (535 1st Class, 550 Cabin Class, 690 Tourist Class)
- Crew: 720
- Notes: Sister ship to SS Raffaello

SS Michelangelo was an Italian ocean liner built in 1965 for Italian Line by Ansaldo Shipyards, Genoa. She was one of the last ships to be built primarily for liner service across the North Atlantic. Her sister ship was SS Raffaello.

== Design and construction ==
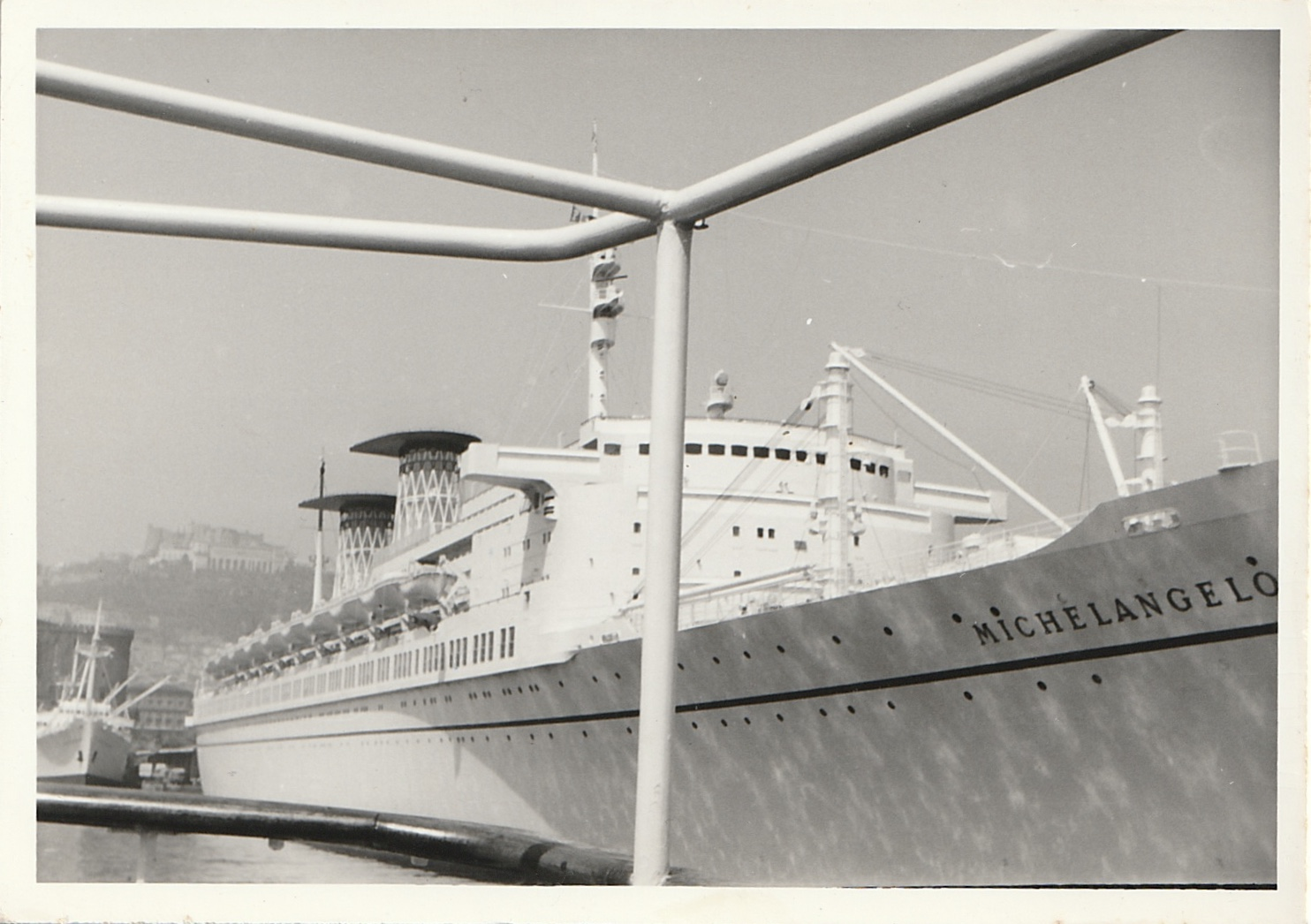
Michelangelo in Genoa, 1967

The Italian Line began planning new ships in 1958. Originally, they were to be slightly larger than SS Leonardo da Vinci, which was then being built, but jet aircraft had not yet had a notable effect on the Mediterranean area and a pair of genuine superliners seemed desirable, both from a commercial point of view and to provide jobs to sailors and shipyard workers. The new ships were to be the largest built in Italy since SS Rex in 1932.

Accommodations aboard the ships were to be divided into three classes. For some reason, the three bottom-most passenger decks would not have any portholes. This was claimed to make the ship's sleek hull shape, but that seems unlikely to be true as ships of similar length/width ratio have been built with windows along the entire hull. Whatever the shortcomings in their initial design, though, the new sisters were advanced on the technological side. The most striking feature in the ships was their Turin polytechnic-designed funnels, which consisted of an intricate trellis-like pipework (instead of the traditional even surface) to allow wind to pass through the funnel, and a large smoke deflector fin on the top. Although criticised, the funnel design proved to be highly effective in keeping smoke off the rear decks. The smoke deflectors became popular in ship design during the 1970s and 1980s, whereas the idea of allowing wind to pass through the funnel was picked up again in the late 1980s and is almost the norm in modern shipbuilding.

Michelangelo's interiors were designed by naval architects Nino Zoncada, Vincenzo Monaco, and Amedeo Luccichenti, who gave the ship a less adventurous, more traditional look than the designers of her sister Raffaello.

== Service ==
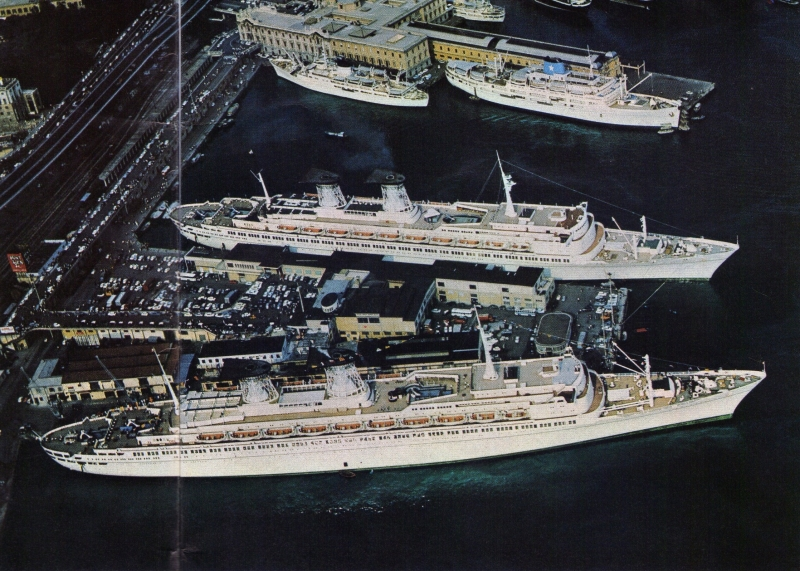
SS Michelangelo and SS Raffaello in Genoa Harbour

After several delays, Michelangelo, under command of Senior Captain Mario Crepaz, was finally ready for service in May 1965. During the sea trials, some vibrations were detected on the stern of the ship. Michelangelo was drydocked in December 1965 and received new propellers and some modifications to her transmission. She clocked 31.59 knots during her post-refit trials, making her the fifth-fastest passenger ship in the world at the time.

On Tuesday morning, April 12, 1966, five days after having departed Genoa, Michelangelo, under command of Senior Captain Giuseppe Soletti, was hit by an unusually large wave during a storm in the mid-Atlantic, which caused the forward part of her superstructure to collapse, or to be pushed backwards, and killed passengers Dr. Werner Berndt of Hamburg, Germany and John Steinbach of Chicago. One crew member, Desiderio Ferrari, died a few hours later, and over 50 people were injured. Among the 1,495 passengers on board this crossing were Admiral Ernesto Giurati, president of the Italian Line and former Chief of Naval Operation of the Italian Navy, Italian Chief of Protocol Angelo Corrias, who was heading for a vacation in the States, German novelist Günter Grass and his wife Anna, and Bob Montana with his wife and four children. When repairs were carried out after the accident, the aluminum plating in the superstructure was replaced by steel plates. Similar reconstruction was carried out on Raffaello and other contemporary ships such as SS United States and SS France.

In May 1972, Alfred Hitchcock took a voyage on this ship from New York to his screening of Frenzy at the Cannes Film Festival.

During the following years, passenger numbers in the transatlantic trade declined steadily due to competition from the air, and more and more ships were withdrawn. Michelangelo spent more time cruising to warmer waters, but she made a poor cruise ship with her windowless cabins and three-class layout. She had large lido decks that were superior to even most purpose-built cruise ships of the time, but that was not enough to compensate for the ship's shortcomings, and Italian Line did not have enough funds to rebuild the ship to make her a more usable cruiser. Additionally, she was considered to be too large to be a cruise ship by that time's standards.

Italy's flagship SS Michelangelo made her last Atlantic crossing in July 1975, under command of Senior Captain Claudio Cosulich. Afterwards, she was laid up at La Spezia alongside her sister.

== Sale ==
Several buyers (including Knut Kloster of Norwegian Cruise Line) inspected the ships, but did not wish to buy them due to the costs required to modernise them to cruise-ship standard. One serious buyer, Home Lines, wished to buy the ships and keep them under Italian flag for cruising in the Caribbean. The Italian Line refused to sell the ships, reportedly because they felt keeping the Italian flag would have associated the "embarrassing money-losers" with them.

In 1976, a buyer was found who agreed to the terms sought by Italian Line. The Shah of Iran purchased the ships, to be used as floating barracks. The ships that had cost $45 million each were now sold at the price of $2 million per ship. Michelangelo ended up in Bandar Abbas, where she was to spend the next 15 years.

In 1978, plans were made to reconstruct her as the luxury cruise ship Scià Reza il Grande (in honour of Rezā Shāh), but an expert team sent from Italy to inspect the ship came to the conclusion she was too badly deteriorated to make rebuilding a viable option. Similar plans were made again in 1983, but they, too, fell short.

Finally, in June 1991, she was scrapped in Gadani ship-breaking yard, Pakistan.
