= SS Conte di Savoia =

Italian ocean liner (1931–1950)

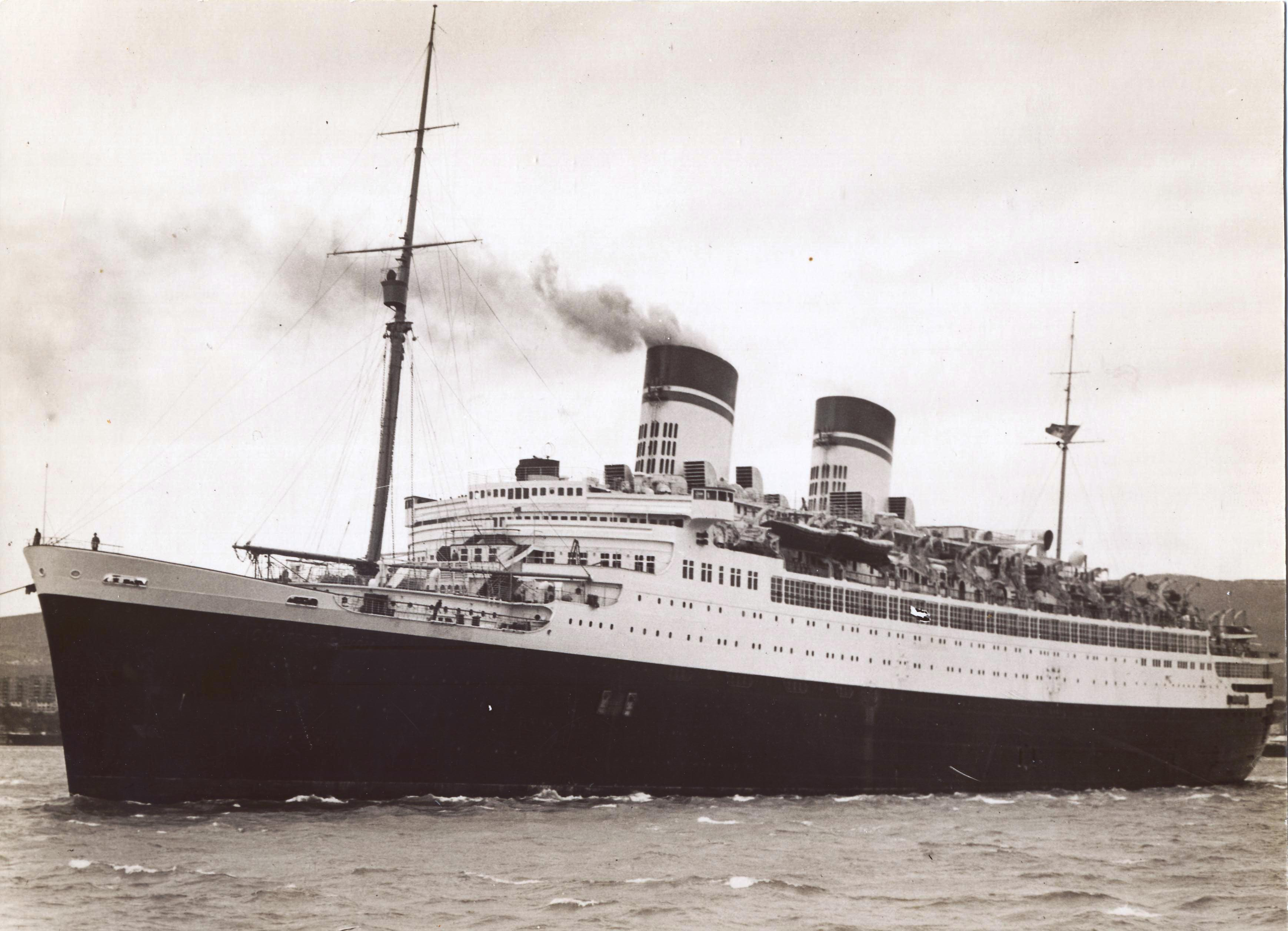

History

Kingdom of Italy
- Name: SS Conte di Savoia
- Owner: Italian Line
- Port of registry: Kingdom of Italy
- Builder: Cantieri Riuniti dell'Adriatico of Trieste, Italy
- Yard number: 783
- Laid down: 4 October 1930
- Launched: 28 October 1931
- Christened: Marie José of Belgium
- Maiden voyage: 30 November 1932
- In service: 30 November 1932
- Out of service: 1950
- Fate: Scrapped in 1950

General characteristics
- Type: Ocean liner
- Tonnage: 48,502 gross register tons
- Length: 248.25 m (814.5 feet)
- Beam: 29.28 m (96 feet)
- Height: 35 m (114.8 feet)
- Draught: 9.5 m (31.2 feet)
- Installed power: Steam turbines 120000 HP
- Propulsion: Quadruple propellers
- Speed: 27 knots (50 km/h; 31 mph)
- Capacity: 2,200 total: 500 first class; 366 second class; 412 tourist class; 922 third class
- Crew: 786 total

SS Conte di Savoia ("Count of Savoy") was an Italian ocean liner built in 1932 at the Cantieri Riuniti dell'Adriatico, Trieste.

Conte di Savoia was originally ordered for the Lloyd Sabaudo line; however, after a merger with the Navigazione Generale Italiana, the ship was completed for the newly formed Italia Flotte Riunite. The new Italia Line also controlled Rex, a similar though slightly larger ship completed just two months before Conte di Savoia. The Conte di Savoia was more modern in decoration and appearance than Rex and was the first major liner fitted with gyroscopic stabilizers.

== History ==
In November 1932, she made her maiden voyage to New York. Unlike Rex, she never made a record transatlantic crossing, reaching a best speed of 27.5 knots (31.6 mph) in 1933.

Conte di Savoia had a unique feature designed to increase passenger numbers. Three huge anti-rolling gyroscopes were installed deep down in a forward hold. These rotated at high RPM and were designed to mitigate rolling - a persistent problem on the rough North Atlantic crossing that affected all shipping lines. In practice, they reduced the rolling by slowing down the rolling period, but they also caused the vessel to "hang" annoyingly when at the extreme limit of a roll. For safety reasons the system was soon shut down for eastbound crossings where the prevailing weather produced following seas, although it was still used on westbound crossings. This was because with a following sea (and the deep, slow rolls they generated) the vessel tended to 'hang' with the system turned on, and the inertia it generated made it harder for the vessel to right herself from a heavy roll. However, these events did not affect the advertising campaign of Italian Line and the benefits of a "smooth crossing" were heavily promoted during the career of the ship.

In 1931, Italian architect, Melchiorre Bega was selected to design the interior lay-out and furnishings of the Conte di Savoia. Bega, who was well known for his innovative designs of stores, cafés and hotels, created a modernist interior.

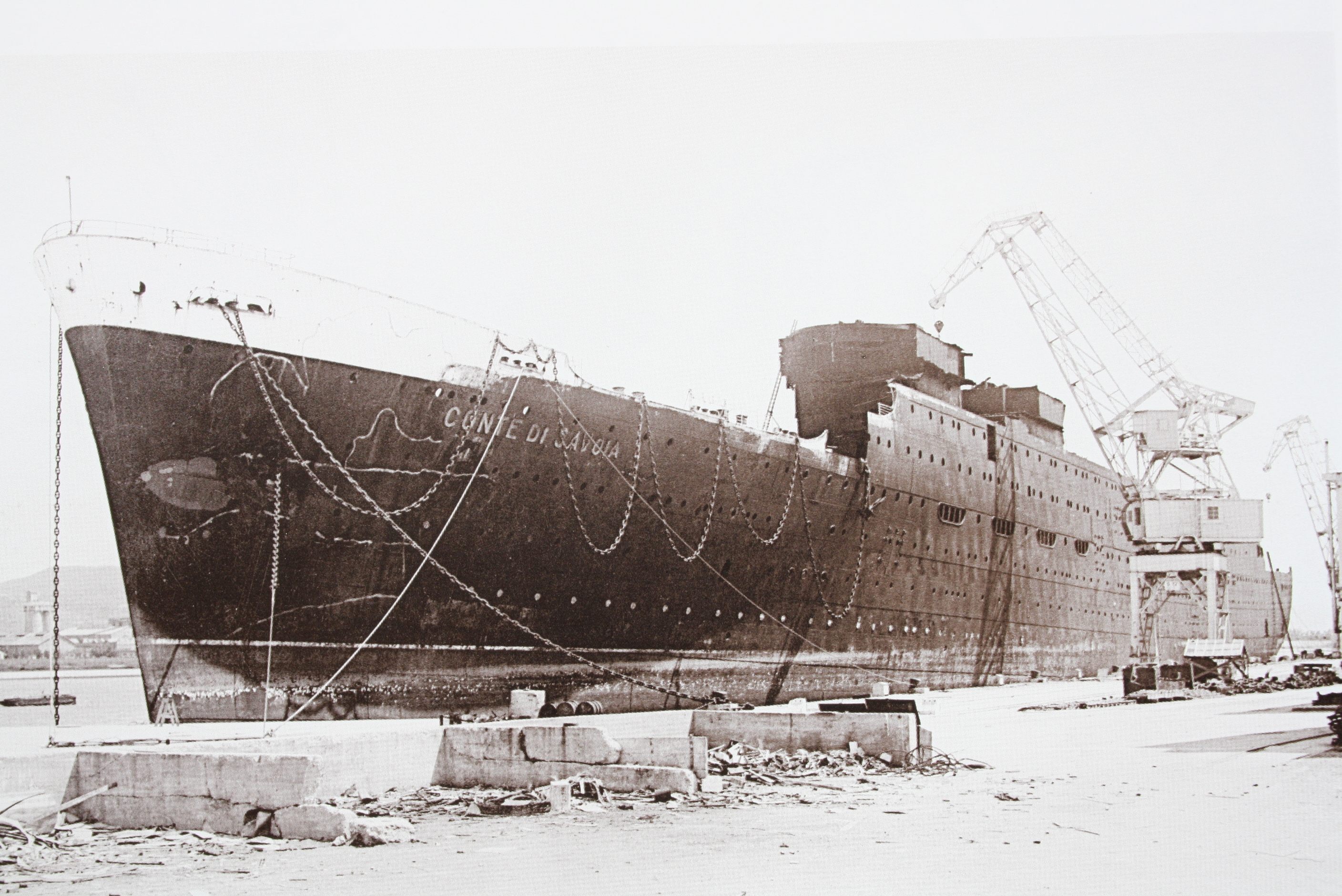
Conte di Savoia being scrapped, 1950

Conte di Savoia was requisitioned for war service in 1940, and was sunk in 1943 at Malamocco near Venice, Italy when the ship was set on fire and subsequently sunk by German forces during the confusion of the Italian Armistice. The hulk was refloated in 1945 and some thought was given to restoring it for service. However, this was ultimately deemed impractical, and she was then sold for scrapping on January 7, 1950, demolition being completed in 1951.

== See also ==
- Eugenio Pacelli's 1936 visit to the United States
