= SS Rex =

Italian ocean liner

Coordinates: 45°32′56″N 13°41′31″E

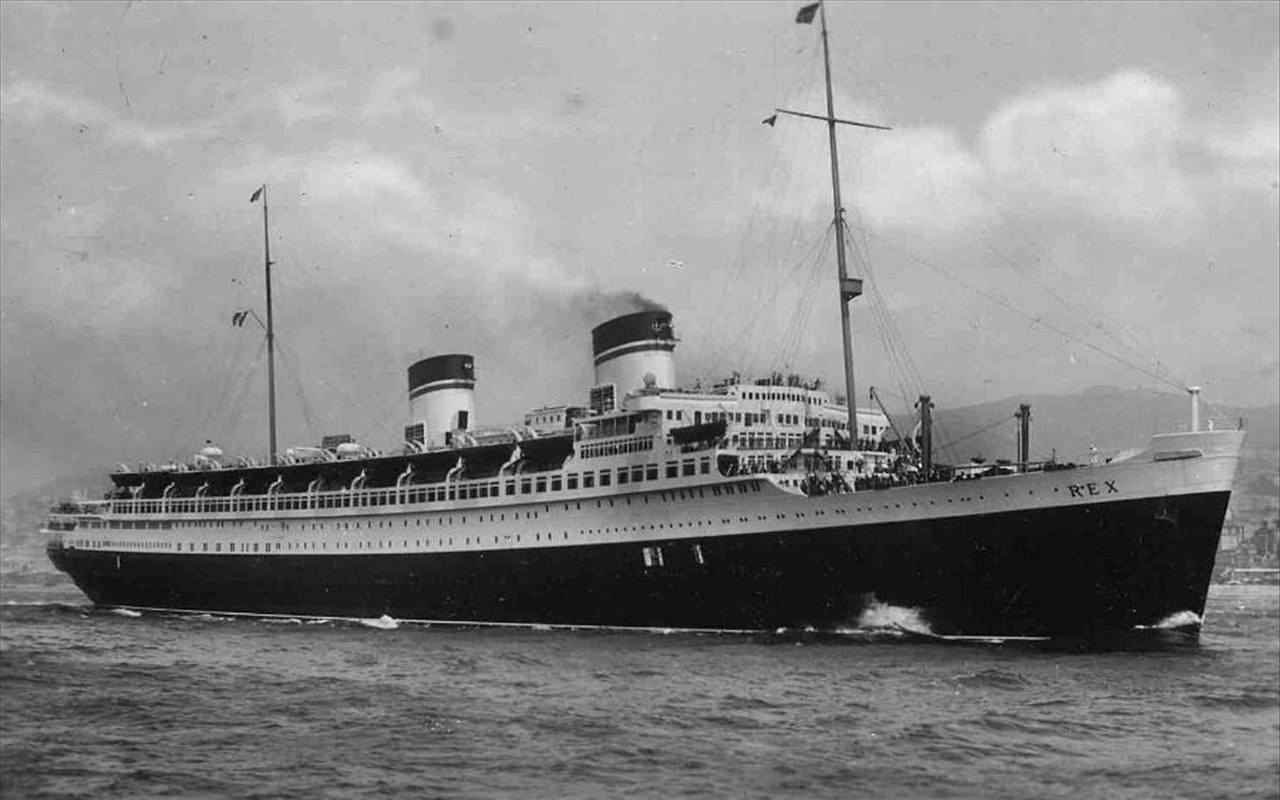
- SS Rex in 1933

History

Italy
- Name: Rex
- Owner: Italian Line
- Port of registry: Genoa, Italy
- Builder: Gio. Ansaldo & C., Sestri Ponente yard, Genoa, Italy
- Yard number: 296
- Laid down: 27 April 1930
- Launched: 1 August 1931
- Maiden voyage: 27 September 1932
- Fate: Bombed by Allied bombers and capsized on 8 September 1944 and broken up in situ in 1950

General characteristics
- Type: Ocean liner
- Tonnage: 51,062 GRT
- Displacement: 45,800 tons
- Length: 880 ft 0 in (268.22 m) overall; 831 ft 3 in (253.37 m) waterline
- Beam: 96 ft 9 in (29.49 m)
- Draught: 33 ft 0 in (10.06 m)
- Depth: 79 ft 9 in (24.31 m) at promenade deck
- Installed power: 4 sets of geared steam turbines producing 120,000 shp (89,000 kW) (design power)
- Propulsion: Quadruple propellers
- Speed: 27 kn (50 km/h; 31 mph) (design speed); Over 28 kn (52 km/h; 32 mph) (maximum speed)
- Capacity: 2,042 total passengers; 408 first class; 358 second class; 410 tourist class; 866 third class

SS Rex was an Italian ocean liner launched in 1931. She held the westbound Blue Riband between 1933 and 1935, for a passenger liner in regular service crossing the Atlantic Ocean with the record highest average speed. Laid down as SS Guglielmo Marconi for the Navigazione Generale Italiana (NGI), this company's state-ordered merger with the Lloyd Sabaudo line meant that the ship was completed instead for the newly created Italia Flotta Riunite (Italian Line).

Rex operated transatlantic crossings from Italy with its running mate, Conte di Savoia prior to the outbreak of the Second World War. Rex maintained a commercial service in the Mediterranean Sea for eight years, but when Italy entered the war in June 1940 Rex was laid up for safe-keeping. On 8 September 1944, off Koper, Rex was hit by cannon fire and 123 rockets launched by Royal Air Force aircraft, caught fire from bow to stern. She rolled onto the port side, burned for four days, and sank in shallow water. The ship was partially broken up in situ in 1950.

== History ==
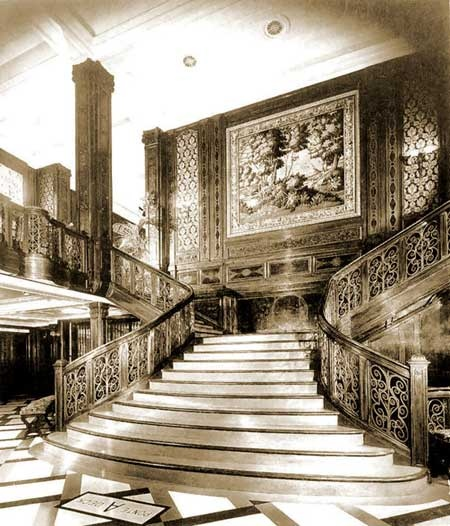
First class grand staircase

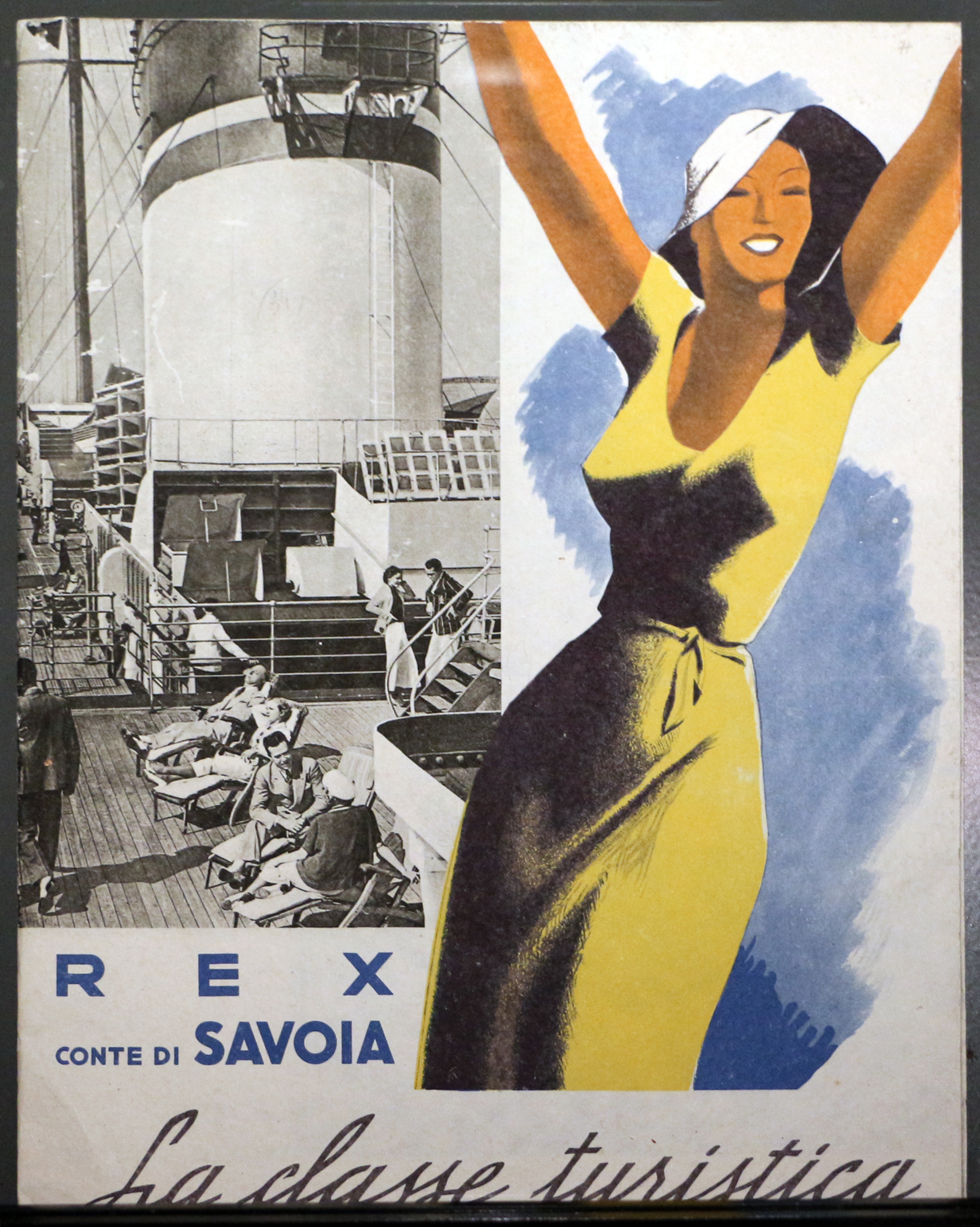
Welcome Flier for Tourist Class of Conte di Savoia and Rex, 1932

Following North German Lloyd's successful capture of the Blue Riband with its Bremen and Europa duo of ocean liners, Rex was intended to be Italy's effort to do the same. Amid intense competition from other shipping companies, the Italian Line carried out an extensive publicity campaign for its two largest passenger ships, Rex and Conte di Savoia. Originally, Rex's owners intended to name her after Italian engineer Guglielmo Marconi, who pioneered the radio telegraph.

Both ships were dubbed "The Riviera afloat". To carry the theme even further, sand was scattered in the outdoor swimming pools, creating a beach-like effect highlighted by multicolored umbrellas. Rex was decorated in a classical style while the norm of the time was the Art Deco or the so-called "Liner Style" that had been premiered on board the French Line's Ile de France in 1927, Rex's running mate Conte Di Savoia followed this rule, but also had rooms with classic style like her First Class Social Room also known as "Colonial Hall" . The ship's exterior design had followed the trend set by Germany's Bremen and Europa. Rex sported a long hull with a moderately raked bow and two working funnels with the colours of the Italian flag (red, white and green stripes), but still featured the old-type overhanging counter stern (also known as a fantail) found on such liners as Olympic and Aquitania.

Rex was the first to be completed and was christened on 1 August 1931, in the presence of King Victor Emmanuel III and Queen Elena. She was both larger and faster than Conte di Savoia. Her attempt of a record-breaking maiden voyage was unsuccessful. She sailed from Genoa in September 1932, after a send-off from Premier Benito Mussolini, with a passenger list of international celebrities. While approaching Gibraltar, serious mechanical difficulties arose. Repairs took three days. Half her passengers requested to leave, preferring to reach Germany's coasts and take Europa; arriving in New York they found Rex already at dock. Lengthy repairs were required in New York before returning to Europe. She arrived in Genoa on 26 October 1932, making her first west-to-east crossing in six and a half days.

In August 1933, Rex fulfilled the promises of her designers and captured the Blue Riband on its westbound crossing from the Bremen with a time of four days and thirteen hours, with an average speed of 28.92 knots (53.56 km/h; 33.28 mph). This record would last until 1935 when it was captured by the French Line's Normandie.

On 12 May 1938, in a demonstration of U.S. air power, three B-17 bombers of the U.S. Army Air Corps intercepted Rex 620 nautical miles (1,100 km) at sea in a highly publicized event.

== World War II ==
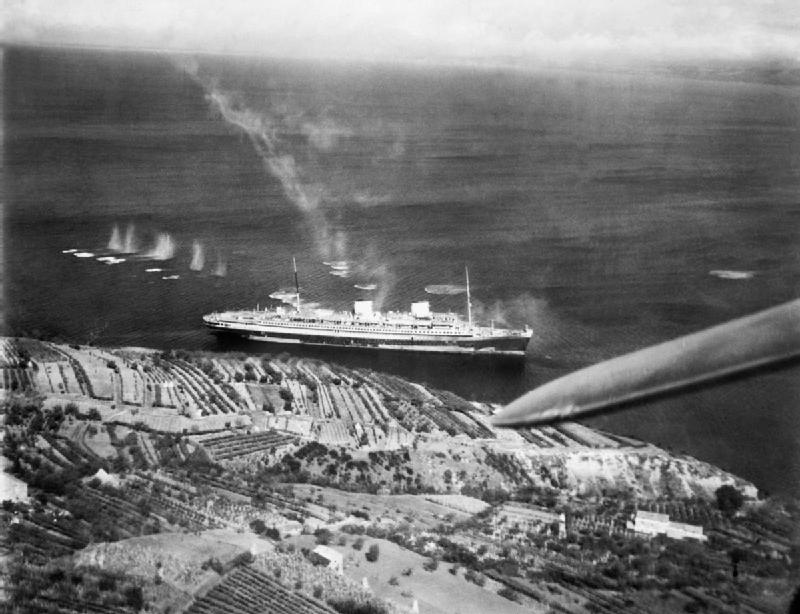
A 272 Squadron Beaufighter climbs away after attacking Rex, (8 September 1944)

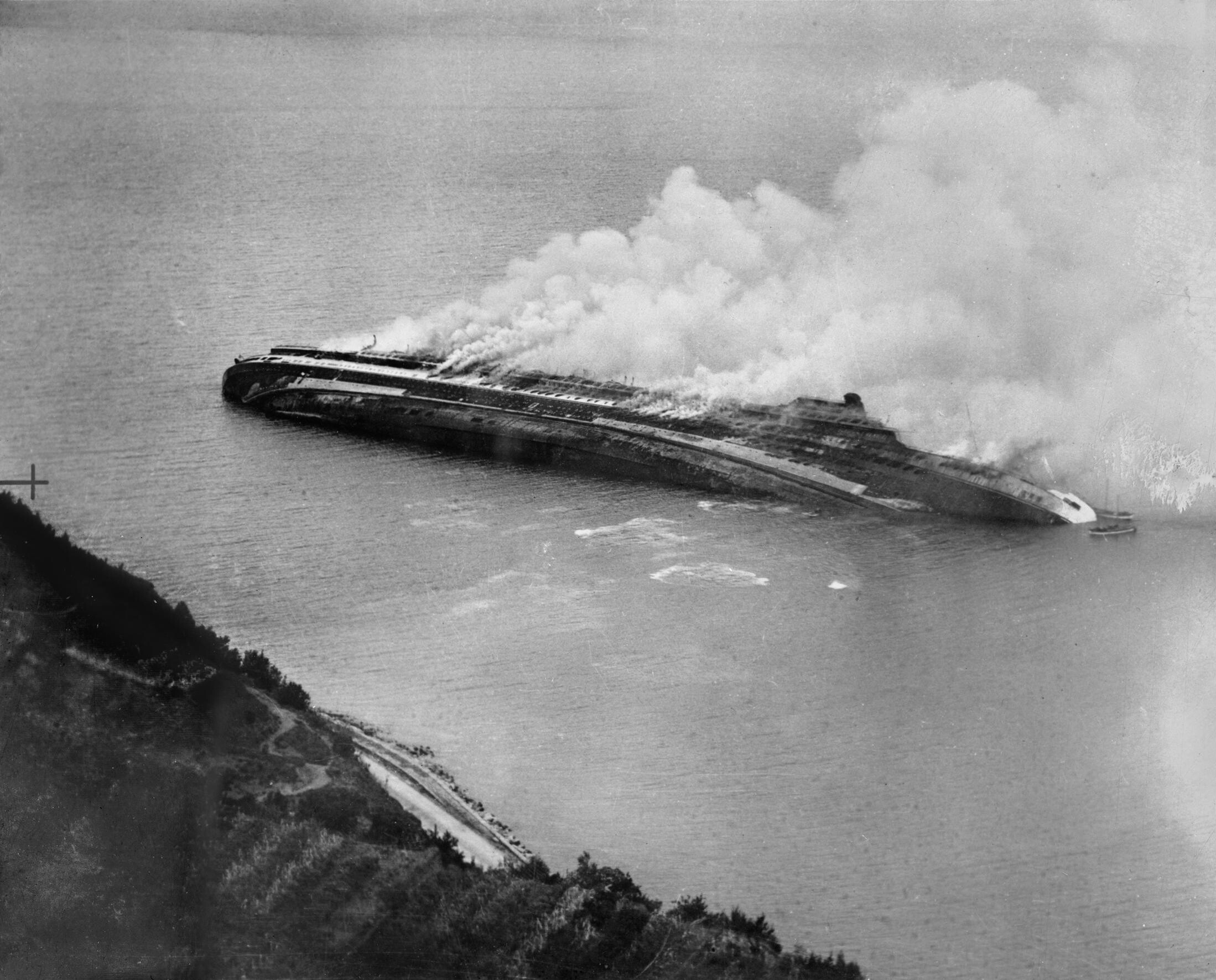
Rex capsized and still burning two days after the RAF attack

Following the outbreak of war, both Rex and Conte di Savoia continued regular Mediterranean cruises as if totally unaffected by events to the north. In the end, Italian liners proved to be among the final ships trading on a commercial basis. Their voyages ceased in the spring of 1940 and they were returned to Italian ports for safekeeping, with Rex laid up at Genoa, but after the city was bombed, the Italian Line decided to move it to Trieste. To prevent German forces from using the liner to blockade the harbour entrance, Rex was moved near Pula, where she lay for some time.

On 6 September 1944, Rex was spotted under tow south of Trieste, by a Royal Air Force (RAF) pilot, and showed a slight list.

On 8 September 1944, she was attacked in the Bay of Koper, south of Trieste by twelve Bristol Beaufighter aircraft of 272 Squadron RAF, escorted by nine North American P-51 Mustang aircraft assigned to the 52nd Fighter Group, USAAF. She was listing and on fire after being struck by 59 RP-3 rockets and numerous 20 mm cannon-shells. A second attack, later that day, by twelve more Beaufighters of 39 Squadron RAF and 16 Squadron, South African Air Force, resulted in her overturning and sinking in shallow water.

== Post-war ==
In 1946, officials of the Italian Line proposed to salvage Rex and restore it for service. However, the liner had been sunk in a portion of the harbor now under the authority of Yugoslavia, which blocked any recovery. The remains of Rex - about one-third of the ship, including the double bottom, boilers, and engines - are located off the Slovenian coast in the Gulf of Koper. The rest was broken up for scrap iron in the 1950s by the local government; it was said that the ship was the largest Slovenian "iron mine" at the time. Since 1954, after the formal annexation of Zone B of the Free Territory of Trieste to Yugoslavia, an anchor claimed to be from Rex has been on display in Congress Square of the Slovenian capital Ljubljana to symbolize the defeat of fascist expansionism. Though claimed to have been salvaged from the liner, this anchor is not of the dreadnought style that the anchors of Rex were known to have.

The transatlantic crossing record of Rex heralded a peak in Italy's cultural emergence; a lasting source of inspiration and national pride. In 1963 Peroni Nastro Azzurro was named for the "Blue Ribbon" (Nastro Azzurro) which Rex won.

== In popular culture ==
The ship was featured in the 1973 film Amarcord, representing the "greatest thing the [Italian] regime ever built."

Records
Preceded by Europa	Holder of the Blue Riband (Westbound); 1933 – 1935	Succeeded by Normandie
Preceded by None	Holder of the Hales Trophy; August 1935 – October 1935	Succeeded by Normandie
