= SS Conte Biancamano =

Italian liner launched in 1925

- SS Conte Biancamano in 1950s

History

Italy
- Name: SS Conte Biancamano
- Namesake: Humbert I, Count of Savoy
- Operator: 1925–1932: Lloyd Sabaudo; 1932–1936: Italian Line; 1936–1940: Lloyd Triestino; 1940–1941: Italian Line
- Port of registry: Genoa, Italy
- Builder: William Beardmore & Co. of Glasgow, Scotland
- Launched: 23 April 1925
- Maiden voyage: 20 November 1925
- Fate: Seized by the United States in December 1941

United States
- Name: USS Hermitage (AP-54)
- Christened: 1942
- Completed: 1942
- Commissioned: 14 August 1942
- Decommissioned: 20 August 1946
- Fate: Returned to the Italian Line in 1947

Italy
- Name: Conte Biancamano
- Operator: 1947–1960: Italian Line
- Port of registry: Genoa, Italy
- Builder: Shipyards of Monfalcone
- Completed: 1948
- Maiden voyage: 1949
- In service: 1947
- Out of service: 26 March 1960
- Fate: Scrapped 1960–1964 at La Spezia, Italy
- Notes: Partially saved as a museum exhibit at the National Museum of Science and Technology named Leonardo da Vinci

General characteristics
- Type: 1925–1941:Ocean liner; 1941–1947: Troop transport; 1947–present: Ocean liner
- Tonnage: 1925–1947: 23,562 GRT; 1947–1960: 24,416 GRT
- Length: 203.56 m (667 ft 10 in)
- Beam: 23.24 m (76 ft 3 in)
- Height: 8.36 m (27 ft 5 in)
- Propulsion: steam turbines double reduction unit and two propellers
- Speed: 20 knots (37 km/h; 23 mph)
- Capacity: 180 1st class, 220 2nd class, 390 economy class, 2,660 3rd class

SS Conte Biancamano was an Italian ocean liner launched in 1925. The name was chosen in honor of Humbert I Biancamano, founder of the Savoy dynasty. She was built in the Scottish shipyard William Beardmore & Co. in Dalmuir, near Glasgow. She was built for the Genovese shipping company Lloyd Sabaudo, operator of Conte Rosso and Conte Verde. The engine, equipped with two steam turbines double reduction unit and two propellers, allowed her to reach a speed of 20 knots (37 km/h; 23 mph), and vented in two funnels. She housed 180 passengers in first class, 220 in second class, 390 in economic class and 2,660 in third class.

Conte Biancamano was the first of two sister ships, her sister Conte Grande not seeing completion until 1927.

== First years of service ==
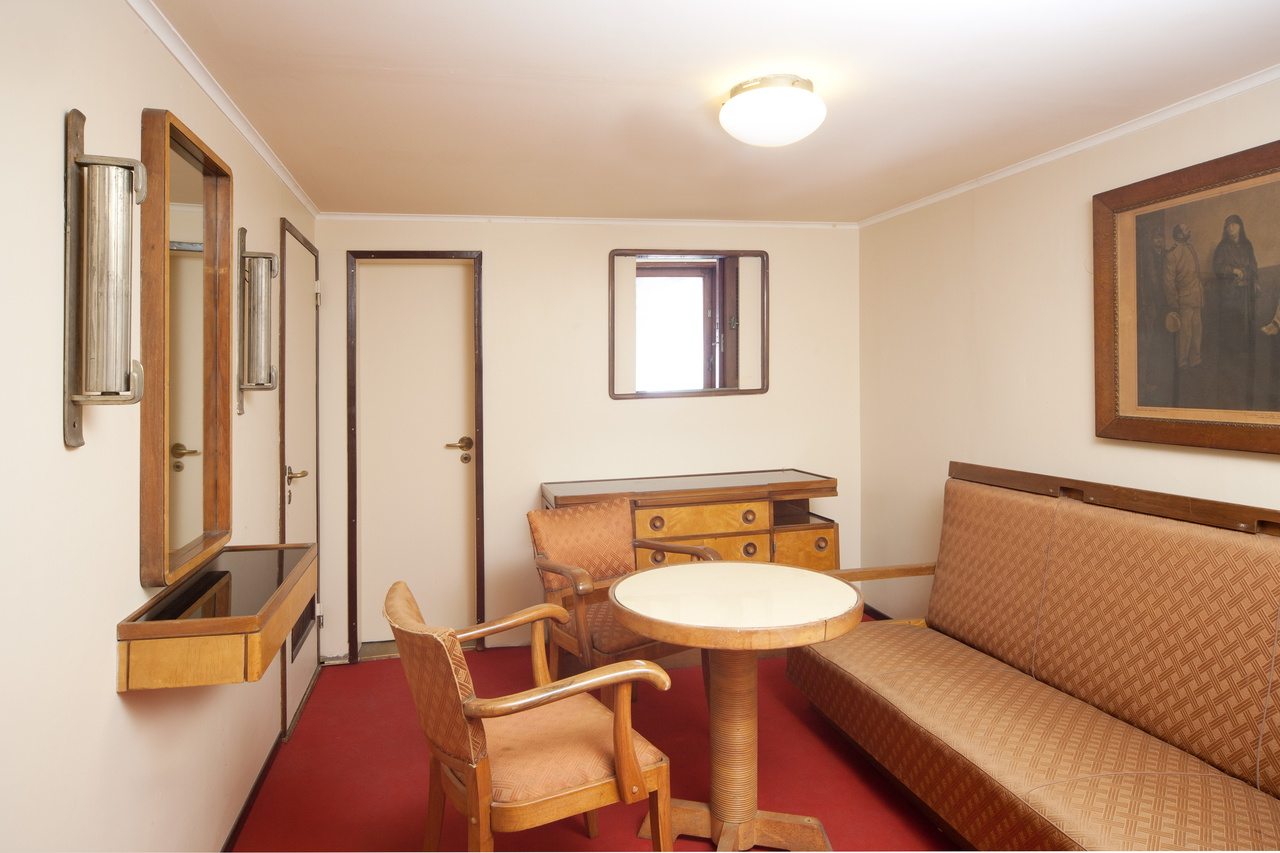
First-class cabin of the Conte Biancamano, reconstruction at Museo nazionale della scienza e della tecnologia Leonardo da Vinci, Milan.

Conte Biancamano was launched 23 April 1925, and made her maiden voyage on 20 November 1925 from Genoa to New York, sailing, as expected, on a direct route to North America. The ship, provided with all the most innovative amenities of its time, was intended primarily as a luxury liner.

The last trip for the Lloyd Sabaudo departed from Genoa to New York on 25 November 1932.

In 1932, Lloyd Sabaudo, together with other Italian shipping companies, merged to form the famous Italian Line. The Conte Biancamano was then used for direct routes to South America. This was continued for six trips, the last of which began on 1 July 1932.

In 1934, she was used for military purposes. She carried troops and military equipment on behalf of the Ministry of the Navy in preparation for the war in Ethiopia.

In 1936, she was transferred to Lloyd Triestino, one of the companies in the group, which took a direct route to the Middle East.

In March 1939, the ship carried the first team of climbers (led by the mountaineer Fritz Wiessner) on the 1939 American Karakoram expedition to K2. Scenes of the team on board feature in a BBC documentary titled 'Mountain Men: The Ghosts of K2'.

In 1939 on at least one passage many German Jewish refugees were able to book passage on her, from Genoa to Shanghai, via the Suez Canal and with stops at many ports, as a means of escaping the Nazi terror and genocide. In 1940, she returned to Italian Line and was used for a trip from Genoa – Naples – Panama – Valparaiso – Panama.

== USS Hermitage (AP-54) ==
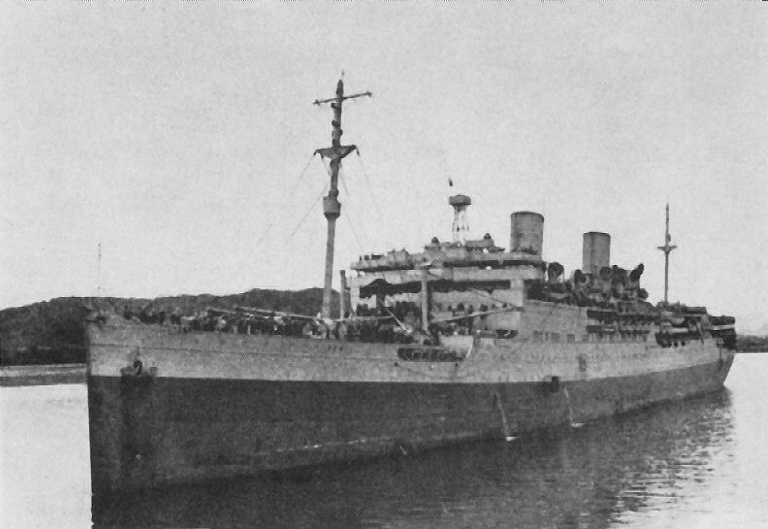
SS Conte Biancamano as USS Hermitage (AP-54)

At the start of the Second World War, she sought refuge in the Panamanian port of Cristóbal, where she was moored. In December 1941, with the entry of the United States into the war, she was seized by the United States. She was converted to a transport by Cramp Shipbuilding of Philadelphia; and commissioned 14 August 1942. The ship could accommodate up to seven thousand men following its conversion. The ship was armed with one 127/38mm gun and six 76/50mm guns.

=== Operation Torch ===
Embarking 5,600 army troops and sailors, on 2 November 1942 Hermitage departed New York with her skipper acting as convoy commodore. Six days later the North African invasion began, and Hermitage on 10–25 November debarked her passengers at Casablanca to participate in the momentous campaign. Returning to Norfolk, Virginia 11 December, Hermitage next headed for the Pacific with nearly 6,000 passengers embarked. After embarking and debarking passengers at Balboa, Noumea, Brisbane, Sydney, Pago Pago, and Honolulu, the former luxury liner put in at San Francisco 2 March 1943.

=== Pacific operations ===
Hermitage's next swing westward, begun 27 March took her to Wellington, New Zealand; Melbourne; and Bombay (Dec. 1943). At Bombay she embarked some 707 Polish refugees, including nearly a hundred children, for a voyage back to California which ended 25 June. In the next year Hermitage made three similar cruises through the South Pacific, with battle-bound marines, soldiers and sailors, civilians, and Chinese and Indian refugees among her diversified passengers. Hermitage reached New York 28 May from the South Pacific via Noumea, Goodenough Island, and the Panama Canal.

=== Operation Overlord ===
Departing New York 16 June 1944 with over 6,000 passengers, most of them bound for the invasion of Europe just begun at Normandy, Hermitage sailed to Liverpool and Belfast to debark the troops before returning to New York 12 July. From then until the end of the war she made 10 more such voyages, principally to Le Havre, to bring replacements to the European theater and transport wounded Allied soldiers and prisoners of war back to the States. V-E Day, 8 May 1945, found Hermitage part of the celebration in Le Havre harbor as Allied ships greeted the end of 6 years of war with a cacophony of bells, whistles and sirens screaming through air illuminated by hundreds of signal flares and rockets.

=== Late- and post-war ===
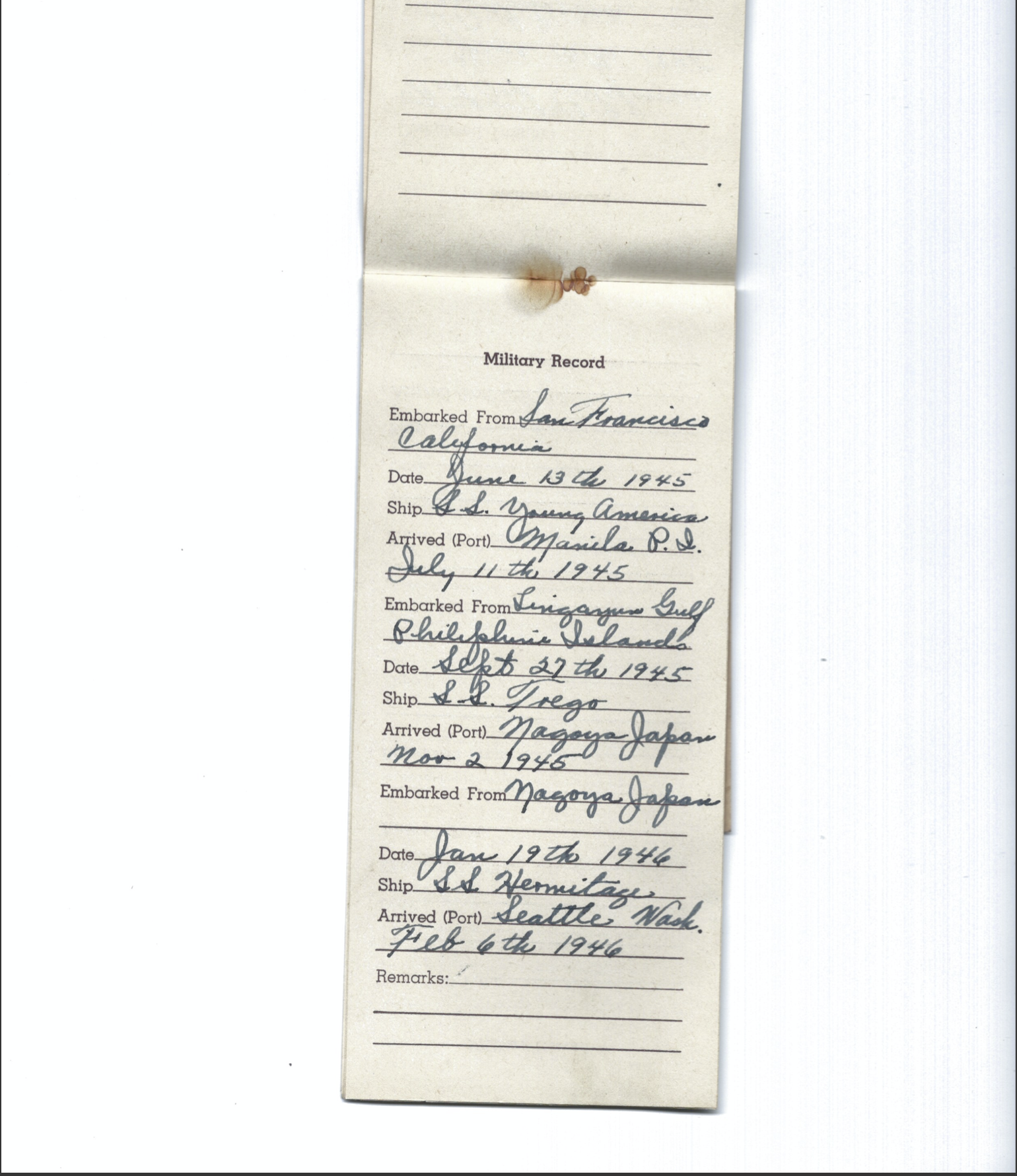
US Army service member's discharge records showing passage on the USS Hermitage.

Following the Normandy Landings, she made several trips between Europe and the U.S. to transport troops and return wounded prisoners, the first of which was on 16 June 1944. She was at Le Havre on 8 May 1945, the day of Germany's surrender.

On Thursday, 22 November 1945 the Hermitage sailed from Marseilles Harbor with 5,799 aboard with units from the 12th Armored Division and the 629th Tank Destroyer Battalion. The ship arrived in New York City on Saturday, 1 December 1945 at Pier 88 North River, at 48th Street at approximately noon.

Departing New York 12 December, the well-traveled transport sailed to Nagoya, Japan, to embark some 6,000 homeward-bound veterans on 19 January 1946 and return to Seattle 4 February 1946. Assigned to the San Francisco-Marianas run for Operation Magic Carpet, the return of thousands of Pacific troops, she made three further voyages before decommissioning at San Francisco 20 August 1946. While serving with the Navy, the former luxury liner had sailed approximately 230,000 miles and transported 129,695 passengers, including American, British, Australian, French, and Netherlands fighting men as well as Chinese, American, Polish, and British civilians and German and Italian prisoners.

== A return to Italy ==
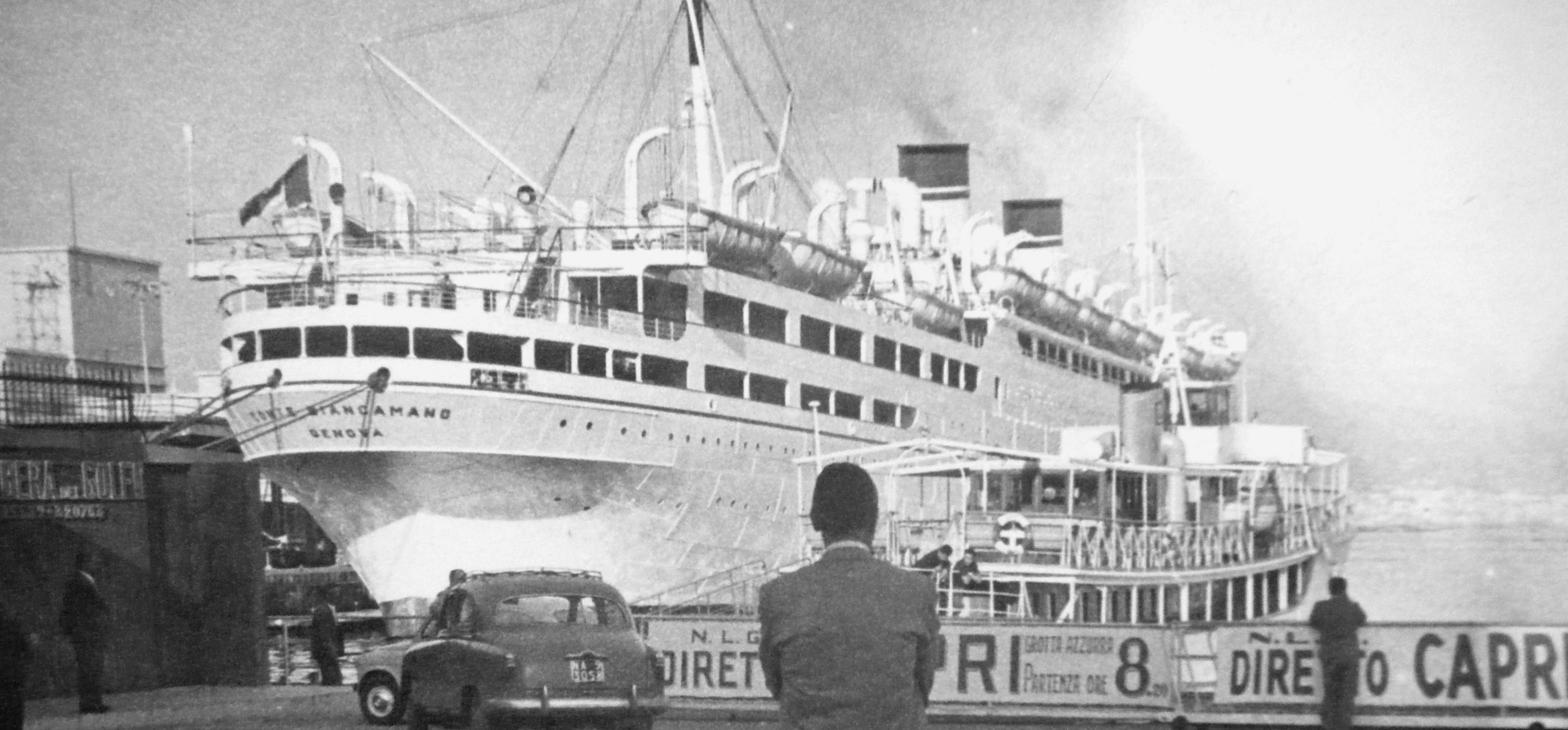
The ship during her last voyage in Naples, 1960

In 1947, the ship was returned to Italy and underwent refit and modernization at a shipyard in Monfalcone in 1948. Structural changes saw her bow replaced with a sleeker design, as well as an increase in length overall. Interior changes included more passenger accommodations, increasing her capacity to 252 first-class passengers, 455 in cabin class, and 893 in economy class.

The refit also saw her name Conte Biancamano restored. With her structural and interior refit and modernization completed, she became the premiere ocean liner of the renewed Italian merchant fleet. Her interior refit was made possible through the collaboration of painters such as Massimo Campigli, Mario Sironi, and Roberto Crippa, as well as decorative design work by Gustavo Pulitzer, Paolo De Poli and Giò Ponti. Art work including sculptures made by Marcello Mascherini were placed on the ceiling of the grand hall depicting the myth of Jason and the Golden Fleece.

On 14 July 1949, Conte Biancamano was placed on the Genoa – Buenos Aires route until 21 March 1950 when she was moved to the Genoa – Naples – Cannes – New York route. In 1955, the ship carried the family of racing driver Mario Andretti to New York City.

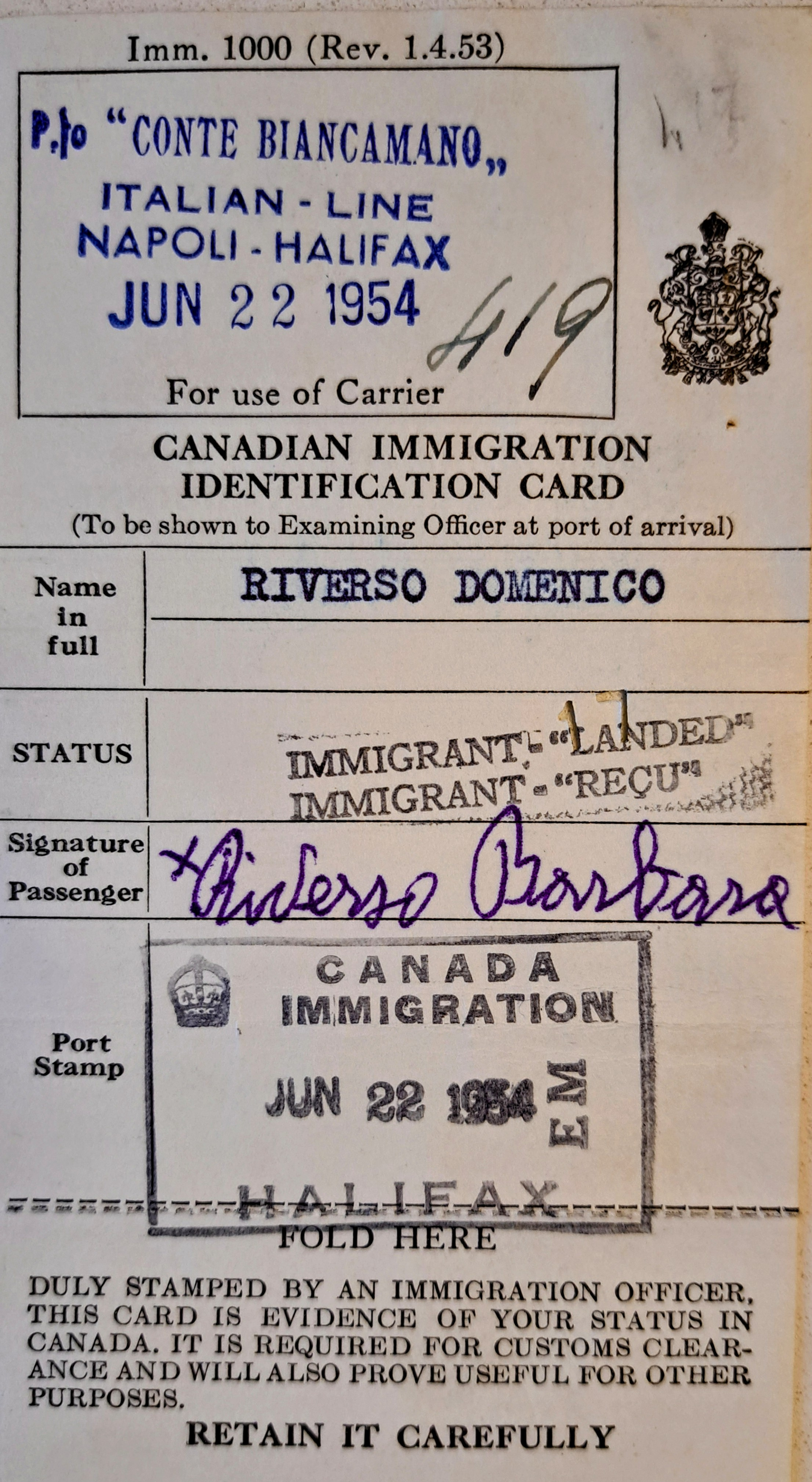

She was returned to the Genoa-Buenos Aires route in 1957, until at least 1958. In May 1957 the body of the late Eva Perón (Evita) was transported on the Conte Biancamano under a false name, for interment in Italy.

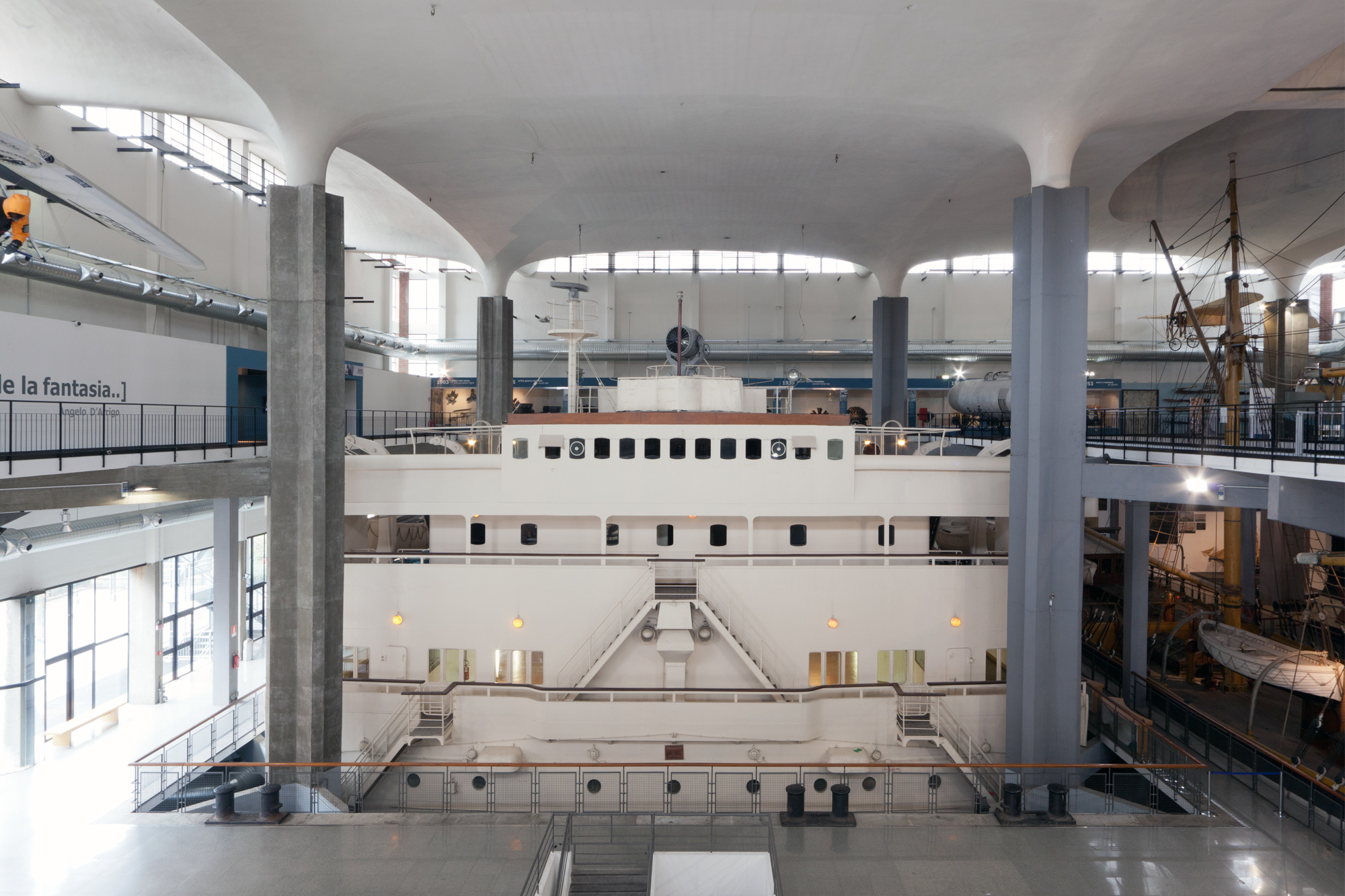
The section of the Biancamano with the bridge at Museo nazionale della scienza e della tecnologia Leonardo da Vinci, Milan.

On 26 March 1960, she began her last voyage on the Genoa – Naples – Barcelona – Lisbon – Halifax – New York route and on her return voyage. After 364 crossings of the line, during which she had carried 353,836 passengers which were put up for disarmament, and started off the demolition, which took place in La Spezia the following year. In 1964, during the ship's scrapping, the bridge, some first-class cabins and the large ballroom were dismantled and reassembled in the Air and ship pavilion of the National Museum of Science and Technology "Leonardo da Vinci" in Milan.

== See also ==
- 45th Portable Surgical Hospital
- A. E. Backus

== Reading list ==
- Hermitage AP-54 – DANFS Online.
- Photo gallery of SS Conte Biancamano at NavSource Naval History
