= Tembien (disambiguation) =

Tembien is a historic region in Ethiopia's Tigray Region and a former province of Ethiopia

Tembien may also refer to:

- Italian submarine Tembien, sunk in World War II
- SS Tembien Italian merchant ship sunk in World War II
- Tembien, nickname of a subunit of the Italian 3rd CCNN Division "Penne Nere", which fought in the Spanish Civil War

== See also ==
- First Battle of Tembien and Second Battle of Tembien, fought between Italian and Ethiopian forces in 1936
- Dogu'a Tembien (Upper Tembien), a district of Ethiopia
- Kola Tembien (Lower Tembien), a district of Ethiopia
