= Lloyd Sabaudo =

- House flag
- Industry: Shipping
- Founded: 1906
- Defunct: 1932
- Successor: Italia di Navigazione
- Area served: Atlantic, Near East, and the Far East.

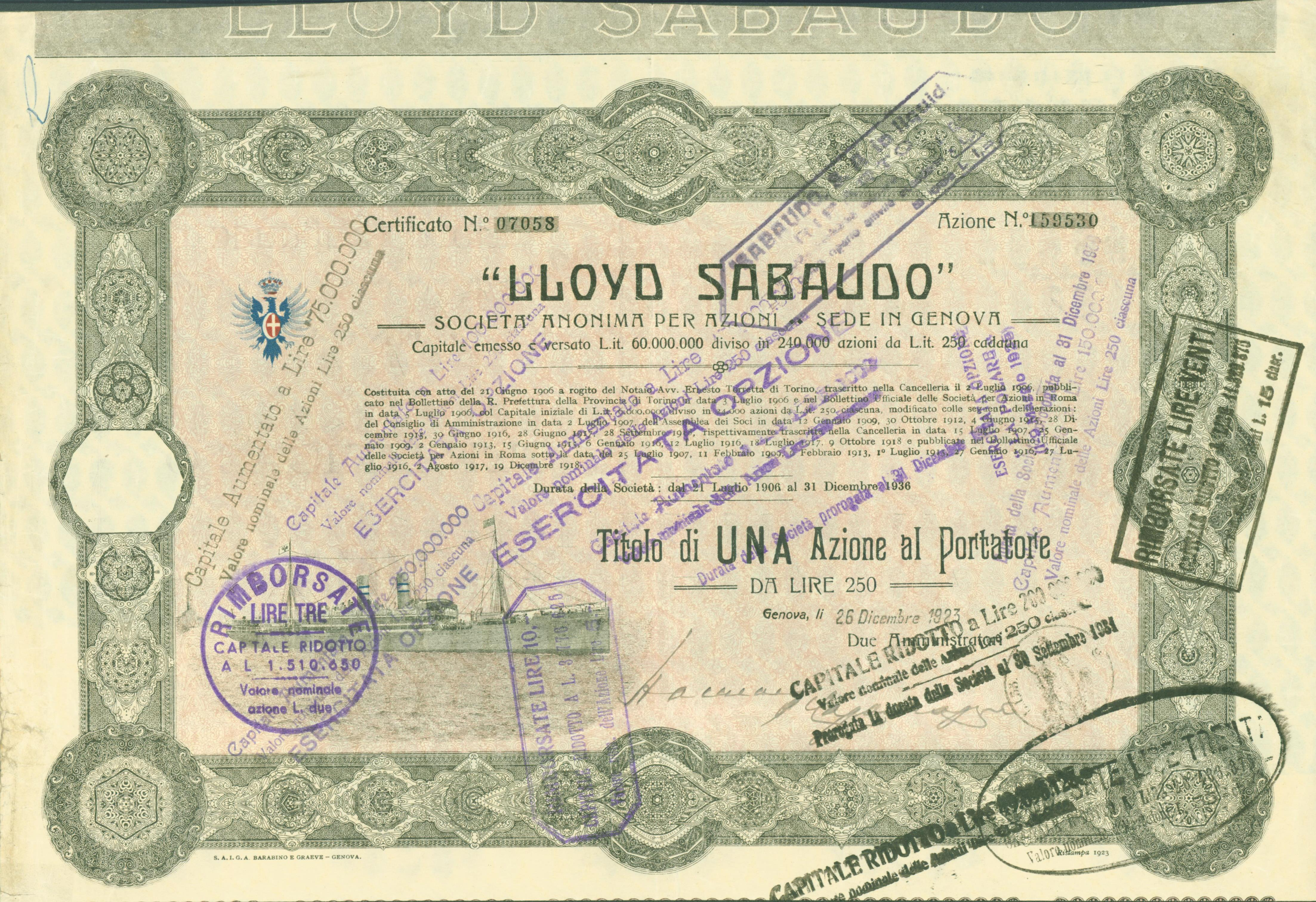
Share of the Lloyd Sabaudo S. A., issued 26 December 1923

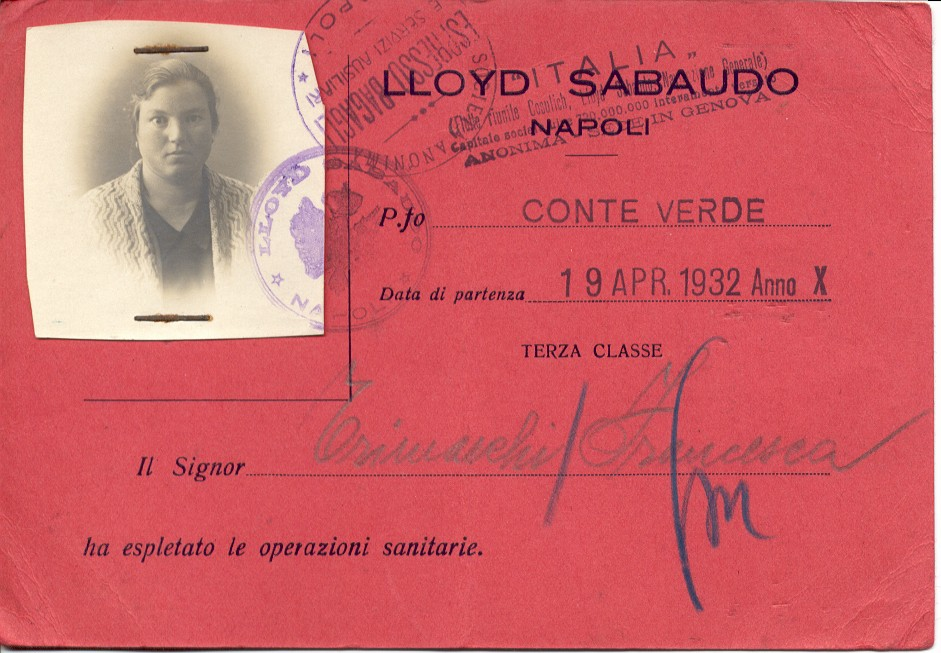
Genoa – Buenos Aires ticket, April 19th, 1932.

The Lloyd Sabaudo was a shipping transport line formed in Turin in 1906. It began passenger service in 1907, expanding to link Italy to ports in Asia as well as North and South America. In 1932, it merged with several other Italian shipping lines to form the Italian Line.

== History ==
As the company was established in Turin in 1906, it starting its service route from, Genoa, to Naples, to New York route, by 1907 it started a passenger service From Genoa to Buenos Aires.

After the positive outcome for the Italian shipping companies of the Mediterranean Conference in Florence in 1906, some leading investors decided to enter passenger traffic to the Americas. The most important shipping company born as a result of this agreement was Lloyd Sabaudo, founded in 1906 with registered office in Turin and home port in Genoa where the operational offices of the company were located. The birth of this company created not a few discontent in the Ligurian shipowning class and, in particular, at Navigazione Generale Italiana which immediately understood that the new company would have made a ruthless competition.

In 1912, the headquarters were moved from Turin to Genoa and in 1913 a branch, "Marittima Italiana" was established to manage services to the Near East, the Red Sea, East Africa, India and the Far East. In 1919 a new connection service from the Black Sea and the Eastern Mediterranean to New York was started which was soon abandoned due to intense competition from other companies.

In 1932 the company was forced to merge with the Cosulich Line and the Navigazione Generale Italiana, to form the Italian Line.

== Some ships of the Lloyd Sabaudo ==
Name	Shipyard	GRT	Length [m]	Passengers	Launch/ Entered service	Notes
Conte Rosso	William Beardmore and Company	18,500	180	1,950 passengers	10 February 1921; 14 March 1922	Sunk on 24 May 1941 by HMS Upholder
Conte Verde	William Beardmore and Company	18,761	180.1	2,430 passengers	October 21, 1922; April 21, 1923	Scuttled in Shanghai by her Italian crew to prevent seizure by Japanese forces, refloated and scrapped in 1949
Conte Biancamano	William Beardmore and Company	23,562	203.56	3,450 passengers	23 April 1925; 20 November 1925	Partially saved as a museum exhibit at the National Museum of Science and Technology named Leonardo da Vinci
Conte Grande	Stabilimento Tecnico Triestino	25,661	198.9	1,718 passengers	29 June 1927; 13 April 1928	Scrapped in 1961
Conte di Savoia	Cantieri Riuniti dell'Adriatico	48,502	248.25	2,200 passengers	18 October 1931; 30 November 1932	Sunk in 1943, and despite being refloated was scrapped in 1950

== Gallery ==
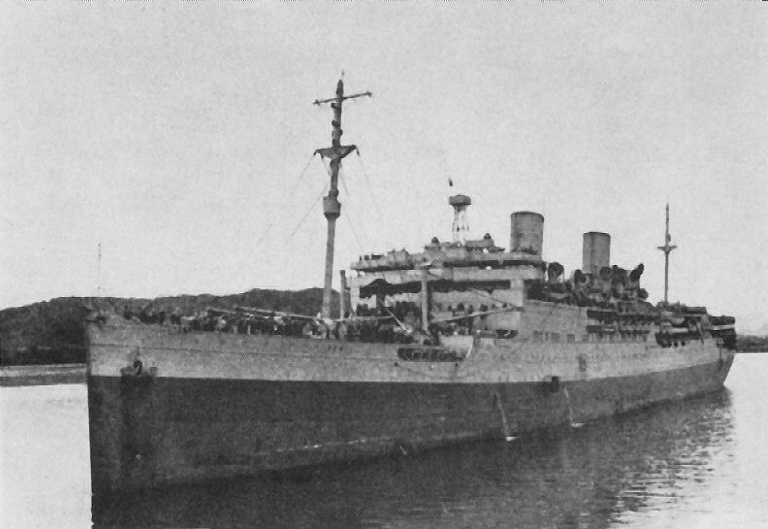
SS Conte Biancamano as USS Hermitage

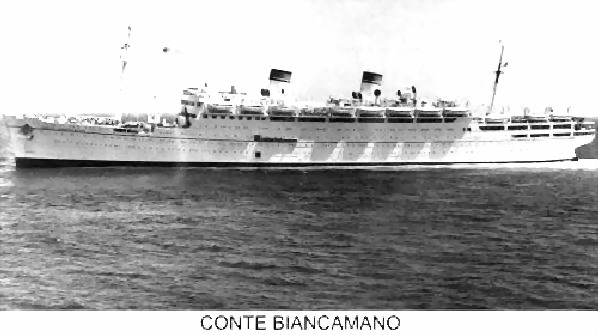
SS Conte Biancamano after her reconstruction

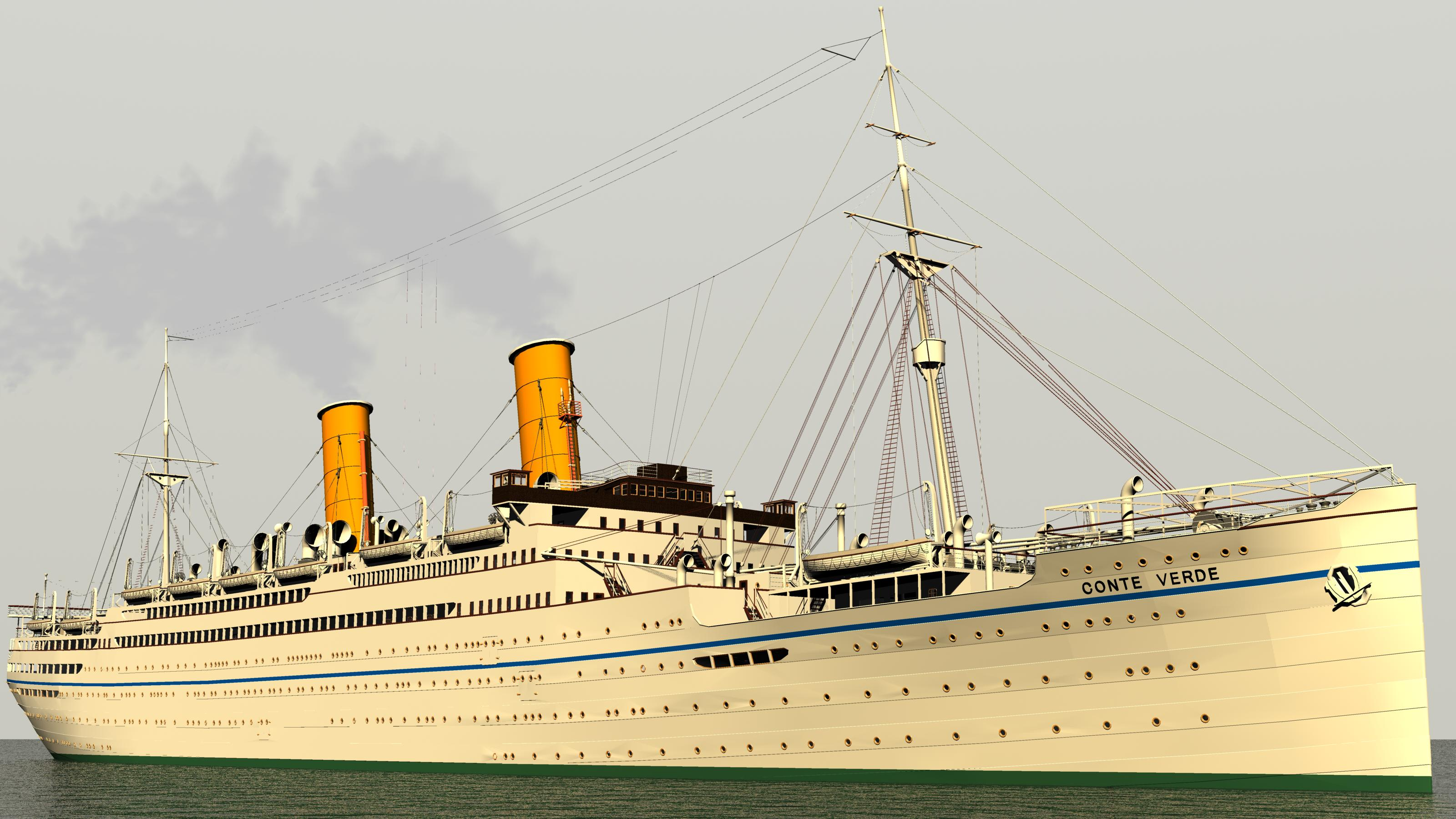
Model of SS Conte Verde

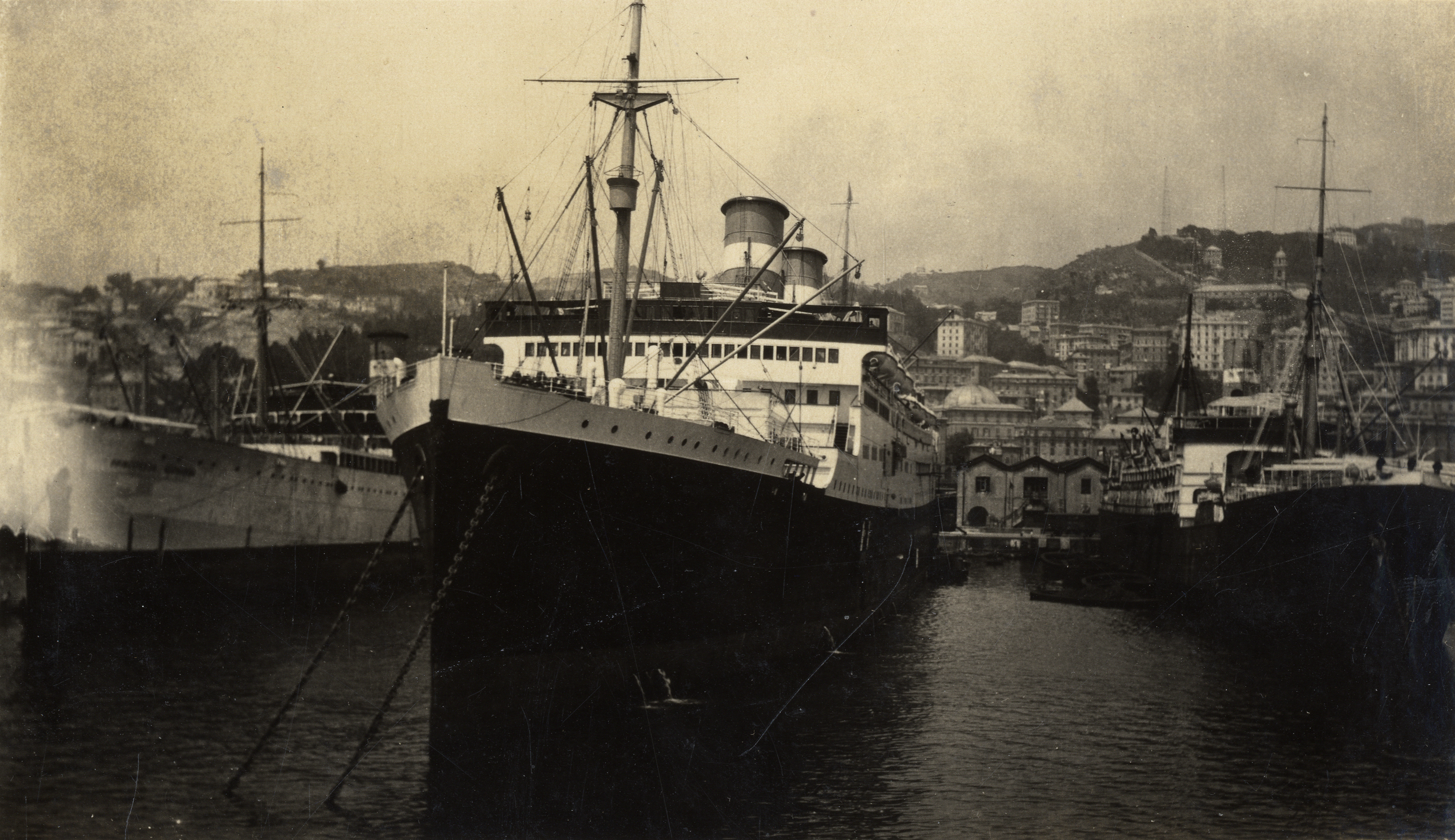
SS Conte Grande

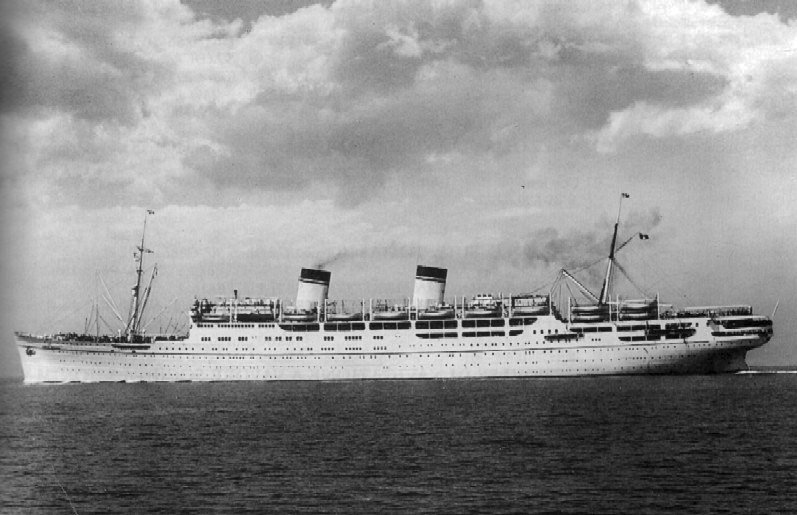
SS Conte Grande after her reconstruction
