= David Wanklyn =

Royal Navy submarine commander

Malcolm David Wanklyn
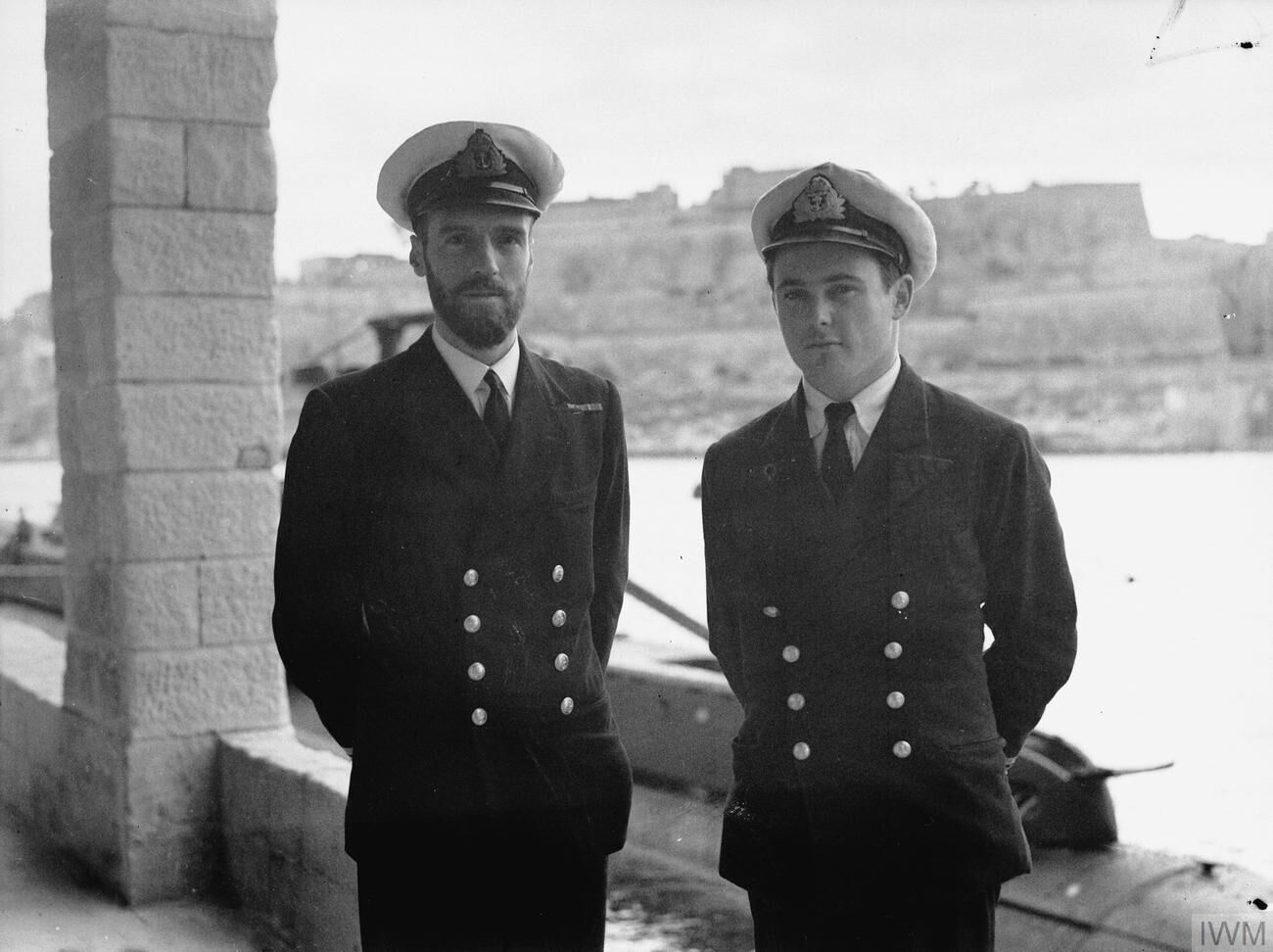
- Wanklyn (left) with his first lieutenant and senior engineer J. R. D. Drummond (right), 13 January 1942 (Note: Drummond was later lost in command of HMS Sickle.)
- Born: 28 June 1911; Calcutta, British India
- Died: 14 April 1942 (aged 30); Mediterranean Sea
- Military career
- Allegiance: United Kingdom
- Branch: Royal Navy
- Service years: 1925–1942
- Rank: Lieutenant Commander
- Nickname: Wanks
- Units: Royal Navy Submarine Service
- Commands: HMS Upholder (1940–42); HMS H31 (1940)
- Conflicts: Second World War: Battle of the Mediterranean; Siege of Malta; Operation Excess; Operation Substance; Battle of the Duisburg Convoy
- Awards: Victoria Cross; Distinguished Service Order & Two Bars

Lieutenant Commander Malcolm David Wanklyn, VC, DSO & Two Bars (28 June 1911 – missing in action 14 April 1942) was a Royal Navy commander and one of the most successful submariners in the Western Allied navies during the Second World War. Wanklyn and his crew sank 16 enemy vessels.

Born in 1911 to an affluent family in Kolkata, British India, Wanklyn was influenced into a military career at a young age. His father was a successful businessman and engineer who served in the British Army in the First World War and his uncle was a destroyer commander who had a successful war fighting German U-boats in the First Battle of the Atlantic.

Wanklyn developed a seafaring interest at the age of five and applied to join the Royal Navy aged 14. Despite some physical ailments, he was able to pass the selection boards. He progressed as commissioned officer fairly quickly and by 1931 had been promoted to sub-lieutenant and lieutenant two years later in 1933. After serving on a variety of surface ships, he joined the submarine service.

After the outbreak of the Second World War, Wanklyn was given command of HMS H31 which he commanded from February until August 1940. Wanklyn sailed on patrol in the North Sea, during which he sank one vessel. In August 1940 he was given command of newly commissioned HMS Upholder. In December 1940 the submarine was reassigned to the Mediterranean. Wanklyn began the first of his patrols in January 1941 and remained on operations in the Battle of the Mediterranean for the remainder of his career.

During 15 months of operations, Wanklyn led Upholder on 27 patrols and sank 11 Axis merchant and troopships while damaging four more. During his combat career he fought many actions with Regia Marina (Italian Navy) warships. He sank one destroyer and one minesweeper, and damaged a light cruiser. In a rare achievement, he also sank three Italian submarines. It amounted to 128,353 tons of enemy shipping. For the sinking of the heavily defended enemy transport SS Conte Rosso without working Asdic, he received the Victoria Cross, the highest and most prestigious award for gallantry in the face of the enemy that can be bestowed upon personnel in the British and Commonwealth forces.

On 14 April 1942, while on his 28th patrol, Wanklyn and his crew disappeared. He was posted missing in action. His exact fate remains unknown. Research suggests Upholder was sunk by a combination of an Italian warship and German aircraft. In 1986 the Royal Navy launched another submarine of the same name. The Upholder/Victoria-class submarine HMS Upholder served until 1994 when it was transferred to the Royal Canadian Navy as HMCS Chicoutimi. It remains operational.

== Early life and family ==
David Wanklyn's parents were William Lumb Wanklyn and Marjorie Wanklyn. His father was English and his mother's parents were Irish. As a young man Wanklyn preferred to be thought of as Scottish. He spent his formative years in Scotland and developed a close affinity for the country and people. He learned to shoot and practice his fishing skills while living there.

Wanklyn's father was born in Argentina and brought up in Ayrshire, Scotland. His ancestors had moved to Argentina in the 19th century. His maternal grandfather was managing director of the Mercantile Bank of the River Plate until its collapse in 1875. His grandfather, Frederick, died soon afterwards and his grandmother Elizabeth discovered his estate had been mismanaged. Left destitute, she headed back to England with her eight children including William. Ill-fortune struck again during their return when the vessel in which they were travelling, the Royal Mail Steam Packet Company, Boyne, ran aground on Friday 13 August on the rocks off the Isle of Molene, near Brest, France. The family lost most of their belongings.

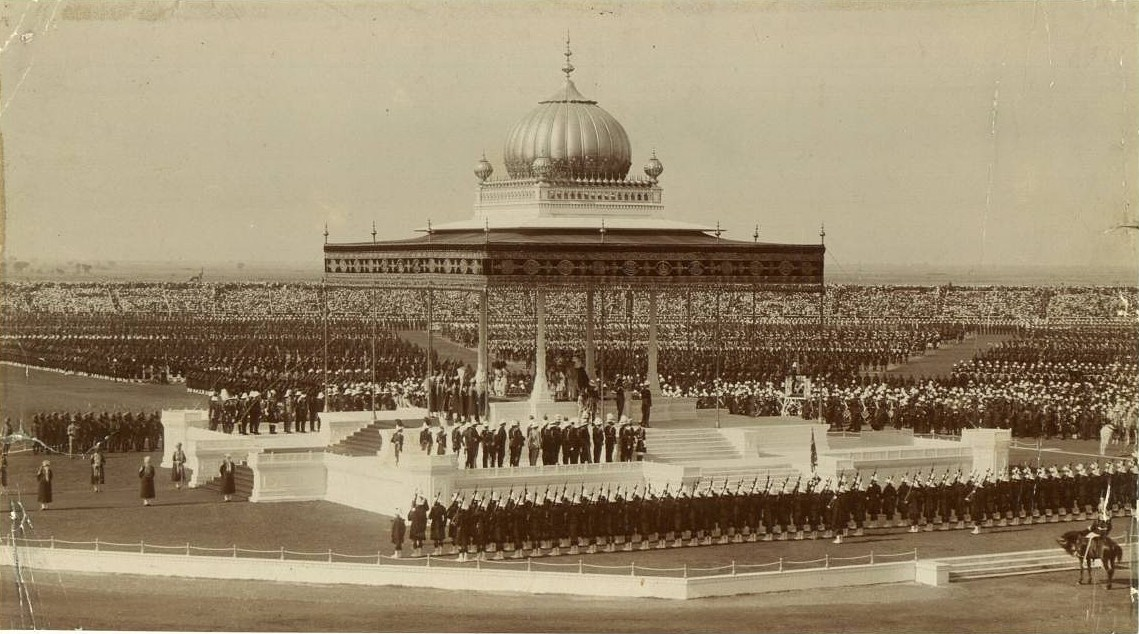
The Delhi Durbar of 1911, with King George V and Queen Mary seated upon the dais.

With little money, his mother sent William to one of the family's many connections. He was adopted by a wealthy Manchester businessman who relocated him to the family's Ayrshire residence. He attended Marlborough College and qualified as an engineer. He married Marjorie Josephine Rawson in 1906. At 21 she was 14 years his junior. Eventually they moved to India. William was appointed chief engineer of the Port Engineering Company based near Calcutta. During this time they travelled around the Far East and North America generating business contacts.

On 28 June 1911 their third son, Malcolm "David" Wanklyn was born in Kolkata, India. He had two brothers Peter (b. 1907), Patrick (b. 1915), and two sisters, Nancy (b. 1917—died of meningitis on her first birthday) and Nancy (b. 1924). The Wanklyns quickly became wealthy and by the time of David's birth they were at the height of their material and social success. In 1911 they were invited to the Delhi Durbar, attended by King George V and Queen Mary.

When the First World War broke out in 1914 William Wanklyn joined the Calcutta Light Horse. He served on the Western Front until 1915 when he returned home to the commissioned officer rank of major in the Royal Engineers. When he was only six, David Wanklyn became enamoured with the sea. At this age he first met his uncle, his mother's brother. Lieutenant Alec Anderson was serving in the Royal Navy. He had commanded a destroyer, and during a convoy escort operation he had rammed and sunk a German U-boat off the coast of Ireland. His crippled ship was towed into Newport for repairs, and he used the opportunity to visit his sister and nephew in Scotland. The meeting had a profound effect upon David, who was deeply impressed by his exploits. Alec survived the war, but not the 1918 flu pandemic.

Wanklyn became a keen sailor and angler and was particularly fond of shooting. He was also an accomplished musician. In his teenage years, his uncle's stories were still vivid and Wanklyn's desires still lay with a naval career. He attended Parkfield Preparatory School in Haywards Heath, Sussex. Academically he excelled, although he was shy and a loner, and had a propensity to avoid team games. Nevertheless, his intellectual approach to his studies won him respect amongst his fellow students and made him a popular individual.

== Royal Navy ==
In 1925 he applied to join the Royal Navy. During the selection board process it was discovered he was colour blind. This congenital disorder would normally have ended his career. Fortunately the chief medical officer was a patient man and coached him to differentiate between what he was seeing and what was a congenital illusion. He passed the written examinations and negotiated the Admiralty Interview Board. In 1925, he entered Dartmouth Naval College.

He was assigned as a midshipman on 1 May 1929 after finishing top of his class in five subjects. In 1930 he was assigned to the battleship Marlborough, part of the Third Battle Squadron; and the following year to the battlecruiser Renown in September 1931 on which he served with fellow midshipman, and future vice admiral, Peter Gretton. While serving in the ship, Wanklyn was promoted to acting sub-lieutenant, the equivalent of an army second lieutenant. He was promoted sub-lieutenant on 1 January 1932. Soon afterwards he moved to the naval gunnery school—HMS Excellent—at Whale Island, Portsmouth to learn more about naval navigation to qualify for his second ring at the rank of lieutenant. In February 1933 he moved to HMS Dolphin and was promoted lieutenant on 1 February 1933.

=== Submarine service ===
After attending promotion courses in 1932 he joined the Royal Navy Submarine Service the following spring, 1933. He served at Gosport and undertook intensive training on submarines. In September he served in the submarine Oberon which was part of the Mediterranean Fleet. It was his first appointment as a submariner. In 1934 he accompanied his new post on trips around the Mediterranean. Visits to Gibraltar, Malta, Algeria, France and Italy followed. In October 1934 he transferred to HMS L56 based with the rest of the 6th Submarine Flotilla at Portsmouth. Wanklyn spent a year on board before becoming the boat's first lieutenant. He learned a number of officer functions and was responsible for the vessel's diving trim and crew discipline. He would recall the performance of the L-class submarine when he commanded other such vessels in early 1940. He served aboard HMS Shark for the majority of 1937 and 1938 and became her first lieutenant.

He patrolled around Gibraltar during the Spanish Civil War. Admiralty orders dictated any Nationalist or Spanish Republican Navy vessel that attempted to attack British shipping was to be sunk on sight. On one occasion, the submarine encountered a German U-boat. The two submarines watched each other from a distance of one nautical mile (1.9 km; 1.2 mi) without taking action. While based at Malta Wanklyn married his girlfriend Betty at the Holy Trinity Church, Sliema, on 5 May 1938. Wanklyn invited all the officers and men who formed a guard of honour. It was not usual for officers to mix with lower ranks but Wanklyn showed no prejudice.

Wanklyn returned to Gosport in July 1939 and became the first lieutenant and second-in-command of HMS Otway, part of the 5th Submarine Flotilla, in August 1939. The submarine left Gosport on 24 August 1939 and sailed to Gibraltar to take on fuel and supplies. At the outbreak of war Wanklyn was deployed to Malta on 2 September and then to Alexandria in Egypt on 2 October 1939. Over the course of the Phoney War, Otway was in training. On Christmas Day the vessel docked in Marseille. Wanklyn was ordered to London to receive a new command. He was driven to Paris, where he spent boxing day and then on to Cherbourg, where he sailed for England.

== Second World War ==
Wanklyn was then appointed as the commanding officer of HMS H31 on 5 February 1940. H32 conducted several exercises throughout the next few months and refitted in April. By July 1940 the situation had worsened for the Royal Navy. On 14 May the Dutch capitulated. Belgium surrendered on 28 May and France collapsed on 22 June 1940. Some 14 submarines had been lost and the British Army evacuated from Norway in the same month. It left the navy defending British waters against a hostile coastline which ran from northern Norway to the French Atlantic Ocean coast. The Royal Navy prepared itself for a possible German invasion of Britain should the Royal Air Force fail in the Battle of Britain. It was also busy defending sea communications in the English Channel—during the Kanalkampf—and the Battle of the Atlantic.

=== North Sea operations ===
To exert pressure on German naval forces Wanklyn undertook a patrol on 14 July. On 18 July he arrived off the Dutch coast. North of Terschelling Island he sighted three anti-submarine trawlers in formation. After spending an hour closing on the vessels he launched a single torpedo at 07:37, from a range of 900 yards (820 m), on a 125 degree track angle to bring all the ships nearly in line with the torpedo and maximise a chance of a hit. He heard the torpedo through the hydrophones. Two minutes later there was an explosion and the German submarine chaser UJ-126 sank. For the next thirty minutes eight depth charges were directed at the submarine, the nearest detonating 250 yards (230 m) away, before the enemy gave up and retired eastward. A curt statement in his report marked the victory: "The behaviour of the crew was most satisfactory."

Wanklyn returned to port in Blyth. His success was to be rewarded in August 1940. Wanklyn was relocated to the north-west, to Barrow-in-Furness, where he was presented with the command of HMS Upholder, which was then under construction. He commanded her for the remainder of the war. Upholder was a U-class submarine equipped with four internal and two external torpedo tubes. These were supplemented by a 76 mm QF 3-inch 20 cwt deck gun. She was laid down on 30 October 1939 and launched in July 1940. Wanklyn took command just as she was completed and watched over the ship during her construction. The vessel was 196 feet (60 m) long with a beam of 12 feet (3.7 m). Her surface speed was 12 knots (22 km/h; 14 mph) and submerged could reach nine knots (17 km/h; 10 mph). She could dive to periscope depth in 45 seconds.

After a five-month fitting-out and sea trial phase she was declared battle ready. Wanklyn sailed for the Mediterranean Theatre on 10 December 1940. The vessel docked at Gibraltar before deploying for Malta. The entry of Italy into the war on 10 June 1940 had made the region a war zone. The Italian Navy (Regia Marina) and Italian Air Force (Regia Aeronautica) laid siege to the island. In September 1940 the Italian invasion of Egypt began a major land campaign. The objective of British submarine forces was to prevent the large Italian merchant fleets from supplying the Italian Army, and later the German Afrika Korps, in North Africa. Wanklyn now formed part of the 10th Submarine Flotilla in Malta under the command of Commander George Simpson. Upholder arrived there on 14 January 1941. While journeying to Malta, he provided distant cover for the supply fleet Operation Excess.

=== Mediterranean ===
Wanklyn's first success in this theatre was an attack on a large ship escorted by a destroyer heading to port in Tripoli. At 01:30 on 26 January 1941 he began his attack surfaced. He evaded the destroyer, but both torpedoes missed. Later another convoy was sighted and he fired two torpedoes but once again, both missed. On 28 January 1941 Wanklyn's lookouts sighted another convoy. Closing undetected to 900 yards (820 m), he scored one hit on the 7,500-ton transport Duisburg, which was damaged. On 30 January 1941 he fired two torpedoes at a northbound convoy and claimed a hit on a 5,000-ton cargo ship which has not been confirmed. Having expended all of his torpedoes, Upholder berthed in Malta on 1 February. He was promoted lieutenant commander on 1 February 1941.

Wanklyn was back at sea on 12 February 1941. In the dark, lookouts sighted a submarine and Wanklyn ordered an attack. After realising it was a British vessel from its silhouette, the attack was aborted. It was later discovered the submarine had been the British T-class submarine Truant. Ten days later, on 22 February, restrictions on British submarines were lifted and shipping in the entire Mediterranean Sea was considered fair game and to be sunk on sight.

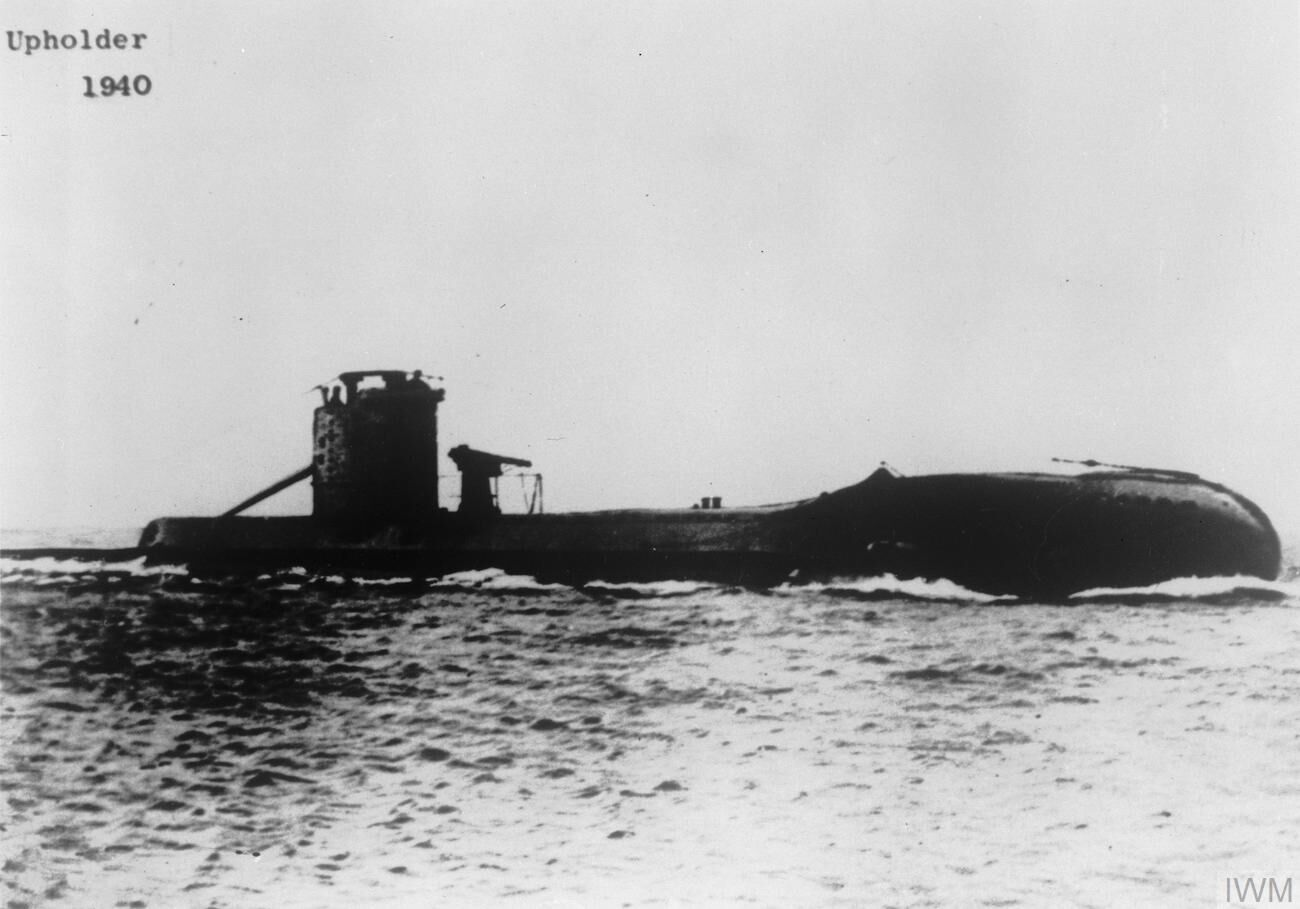
Upholder in late 1940

On 10 March, a convoy of small ships 'in ballast' was sighted off Tripoli. Conscious of the shortage of torpedoes he held fire. While on his fourth patrol, on 3 April 1941, he sighted a convoy but the ships were at extreme range. On 10 April, a second attack went wrong when his torpedoes' tracks were seen and the convoy took evasive action. Upholder was subjected to a sustained counter-attack and was then forced to crash-dive deep when the hydrophones detected a torpedo closing on the vessel. Rather than give up, Wanklyn decided to reconnoitre convoys. On the 12 April 1941 he sighted five large ships with three destroyers. He surfaced to broadcast their position to Malta headquarters, but an enemy aircraft spotted him and Upholder was forced to dive. Later, Wanklyn repeated the procedure which was acknowledged. He fired a star shell over the convoy to mark its position and the enemy fleet quickly reversed direction to port. It attracted the 14th Destroyer Flotilla, comprising Janus, Jervis, Mohawk and Juno. The force did not make contact that night. Days later, during the Battle of the Tarigo Convoy, the same tactics allowed other submarines to lead the force to devastate an Italian convoy for the loss of one destroyer.

In early April, British naval intelligence received a report that Albert Kesselring, the Luftwaffe (German air force) commander-in-chief for the Mediterranean, was setting up his headquarters at the Miramar Hotel in Taormina in Sicily. Simpson selected Wanklyn and Upholder for an operation to land commandos onto enemy-held coastland for an assassination attempt against Kesselring. The town lay 200 yards (180 m) from a rocky coast cut into a hill side in the middle of an oil grove. Upholder was fitted with a fender to protect the hull from the rocks. 23 commandos were to be landed. They would destroy the hotel and its occupants with explosive and gunfire. Wanklyn gave them 40 minutes to complete the attack and return to the submarine under the cover of the deck gun. The day before the operation it was postponed, and submarines were deployed to intercept a convoy from Naples. Two weeks later intelligence reported Kesselring had left the area and the operation was abandoned.

Simpson received a report from naval intelligence that two enemy cruisers and destroyers were leaving port in Sicily to rendezvous with a convoy south of Kerkennah Islands. Wanklyn was ordered to remain off the island of Lampedusa, midway between Malta and Tunisia. Nothing was seen, so Wanklyn sailed to the Tunisian coast and selected an area well known for its convoy traffic. On 25 April Wanklyn spotted a merchant ship and its armed trawler escort but managed to close to 700 yards (640 m) undetected before firing two torpedoes. The ship was hit and sank. It was later identified as the small merchant vessel Antonietta Lauro, which was loaded with nitrates bound for Italy. She sank slowly, and went under after six hours.

The following day, 26 April, he spotted two ships that had run aground. He waited for darkness so that he could escape under cover, and closed on the merchant and its destroyer escort, hoping to torpedo both. As he closed to eliminate the destroyer first he ran aground in 29 feet (8.8 m) of water. Unable to risk torpedoes in such shallow water, he moved alongside the transport, which had been heavily damaged in an attack and appeared to be deserted, with no live personnel on board. The deck was covered in motorcycles, cars and trucks earmarked for the Afrika Korps. Wanklyn ordered a boarding party to loot whatever they could and lay scuttling charges, which blew up the ship. He elected to leave the destroyer, which lay in much shallower water, until the following day. Wanklyn ran aground again and was forced to abandon the attack, returning to base with Arta as his solitary kill.

In North Africa, German forces had gone onto the offensive in Operation Sonnenblume. By late April British Army forces were being forced out of Libya and Tobruk was surrounded. Simpson ordered his submarines to intercept convoys sailing from Naples and delivering supplies to the Axis armies in Africa. To assist, Horton formed the 5th Destroyer Flotilla with the light cruiser Gloucester as support. Simpson sent Upholder, Ursula and Upright. Simpson ordered his submarines into action on 27 April and 1 May. On 1 May 1941, Upholder and Ursula gained contact with a convoy, but the ships were travelling too fast to close to effective range. Six hours later he spotted five transports with four destroyers conducting zig-zagging courses to avoid underwater attacks. The water was rough but Wanklyn fired a three-torpedo salvo at the two largest, overlapping, vessels. Three explosions were heard. The German liner Leverkusen, which had been hit twice, sank by the stern. The third torpedo had stopped Arcturus, which was listing heavily by the bow. The enemy delivered a moderate counter-attack and sped off. Wanklyn used his final two torpedoes to sink the damaged vessel. The tanker Bainsizza was also hit by Upholder and sank immediately. (Note: Bainsizza was third ship according to Edwyn Gray.) The patrol yielded three ships of around 19,000 tons. Simpson immediately recommended Wanklyn and his officers for awards.

=== Leading submariner ===
Wanklyn did not partake in social activities excessively. When he returned to shore he spent 24 hours discussing his patrol report with Simpson and checking over preparations for the next sortie. Wanklyn did this immediately, as no commander knew when he would be called into action again. The toll and strain of operations prompted Simpson to send his commanders into the country to relax when there was a lull in operations. Wanklyn's letters to his wife usually carried the address of San Anton Palace, where he became the frequent guest of the governor General Sir William Dobbie. To release his stress Wanklyn tended to his pig farm and occasionally did some shooting but submariner's greatest hobby was fishing. Although somewhat austere, Wanklyn did play the guitar and drank socially, realising his need to bond with the officers and crew. He did not join in with organised parties, because he was tired and physically drained much of the time.

Wanklyn was called into action again on 15 May 1941. Unique had reported five cruisers and smaller craft convoying in the Straits of Messina. Simpson considered Upholder's presence beneficial. Wanklyn set course for the convoy route to Benghazi and then towards Messina to maximise his chance of catching an enemy ship. Bad luck plagued the early part of the mission. A torpedo leaked and had to be reloaded submerged. A convoy was sighted but was too close to shore and could not be brought within range. Upholder's Asdic had been knocked out. A faulty washer let in sea water which destroyed the insulation around an electrical cable. A signal arrived in the afternoon informing him of a convoy near Patras. Wanklyn's look outs spotted it—a tramp steamer, two tankers and a corvette, barely visible against the backdrop of the coastline. Wanklyn fired three torpedoes at 7,000 yards (6.4 km). One explosion was heard. Minutes later two more were heard but Wanklyn assumed they had struck shore. A 4,000-ton tanker was claimed damaged. Six depth charges were dropped but missed, roughly by one mile (1.6 km). On 22 May an Italian hospital ship was allowed to pass by without an attack.

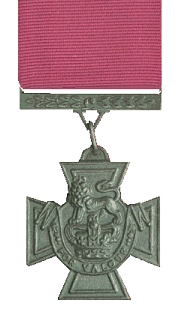
The Victoria Cross

On 23 May he spotted a convoy of two tankers. Looking through the periscope he saw that one ship carried French colours, and consulted his identification books to determine her identify. The crew identified the name on her hull—Damieni. The second ship was called Alberta. There was no intelligence of neutral shipping in the area and both ships sounded Italian. After some thought, Wanklyn attacked. Three torpedoes were fired and Capitaine Damiani, a Vichy French vessel travelling under Italian charter, sank by the stern roughly five nautical miles (9.3 km; 5.8 mi) south-west of Punta di Pellaro. Alberta carried out evasive action and the escorting vessels dropped 26 depth charges and hunted Upholder all afternoon. The following afternoon a further 21 were dropped. None came close. With no Asdic, Wanklyn dived to 150 feet (46 m), as he could not easily determine enemy movements. The enemy abandoned the attacks and at dusk Upholder surfaced.

As it grew dark, lookouts spotted a large ship with five destroyers. The Italian liner-turned troopship SS Conte Rosso was identified by periscope. As he moved to attack he was nearly rammed by the destroyer Freccia which had not seen the submarine. He fired his torpedoes and dived to 150 feet (46 m). He heard two explosions and the ship, carrying the flag of Rear Admiral Francesco Canzoneri, sank with 2,279 soldiers and crew on board roughly 50 km (27 nm) east of Portopalo di Capo Passero in Sicily. Around 1,300 of these men died. Over the next hours he evaded 37 depth charges as the escort counter-attacked. Several days later, one of life boats from the Conte Rosso was found wrecked upon Malta and the sinking was confirmed. The sinking of the 19,000-ton ship, which was under heavy guard, and without working Asdic, prompted the award of the Victoria Cross, the most prestigious award for bravery and skill in the face of the enemy. Wanklyn was gazetted for his actions on 1 December 1941.

The strain of operations was already showing and commander Simpson ordered Wanklyn to be taken off patrols. Simpson could not spare his crew and they were not afforded the same respite. Wanklyn was now one of the most successful submarine commanders on the Allied side and Simpson was anxious to rest him. While off combat duty, Wanklyn lectured and tutored new officers if he was asked, but preferred not to force junior commanders to listen to his experiences. Simpson did not want to expose Upholder to undue risk in his absence, and the submarine was allotted the Messina to Tripoli route, rather than allowing it to conduct operations close to the enemy shore. In Wanklyn's absence, a new 27-year-old commander, Arthur Hezlet, took over from him. Hezlet was an aggressive commander and Simpson made sure to send the vessel somewhere he could not get the crew into trouble, so that they would be returned to Wanklyn intact. Only a German hospital ship came across his path during the single June 1941 patrol, and he was forced to let it go.

Upholder and Unbeaten were ordered by Simpson to sail again on 24 June. A convoy of four liners was sailing from Naples to Tripoli. Wanklyn took a position eight miles (13 km) to the west in error. Hydrophones picked up the convoys propeller noises and occasional depth charges but saw nothing. The boat was recalled and arrived in Malta on 27 June, making this her shortest patrol. It was the first patrol in many that Wanklyn could not fly the Jolly Roger to denote a kill. During these patrols, Upholder hosted war correspondent and future actor Commander Anthony Kimmins. Kimmins contributed an article to The Listener magazine, which was broadcast on the BBC Home Service on 20 February 1942.

=== Summer 1941 ===
Wanklyn was ordered to depart again on 30 June 1941 to patrol the southern Straits of Messina. Within twenty-four hours he had spotted a liner. Upholder closed to very close range and fired three torpedoes, but the skilful seamanship of the Italian captain avoided the torpedoes by zig-zagging. Wanklyn concluded that the torpedoes had probably passed under the ship. The next two days were spent avoiding two destroyers, which were clearing a way for an oncoming convoy. On 3 July, Wanklyn's patience was rewarded when a 4,000-ton tanker hove into view. He pursued it as it hugged the coastline but was forced to break off as it changed course around Capo dell'Armi. While in the vicinity of Cape Spartivento, three hours later, he spotted three ships escorted by one destroyer. The escort suddenly dropped a depth charge and turned straight towards Upholder. Wanklyn dived the submarine to 45 feet (14 m) and climbed to periscope depth when he could hear the destroyer passing off to the west. He engaged a grey cargo vessel laden with wooden packing cases. Two explosions were heard and distress signals identified her as Laura C. The destroyer dropped 19 depth charges, which shattered light bulbs and came close to damaging the submarine. Later, a submarine chaser dropped 27 depth charges wide of the target. Upholder withdrew to Malta on the 8 July.

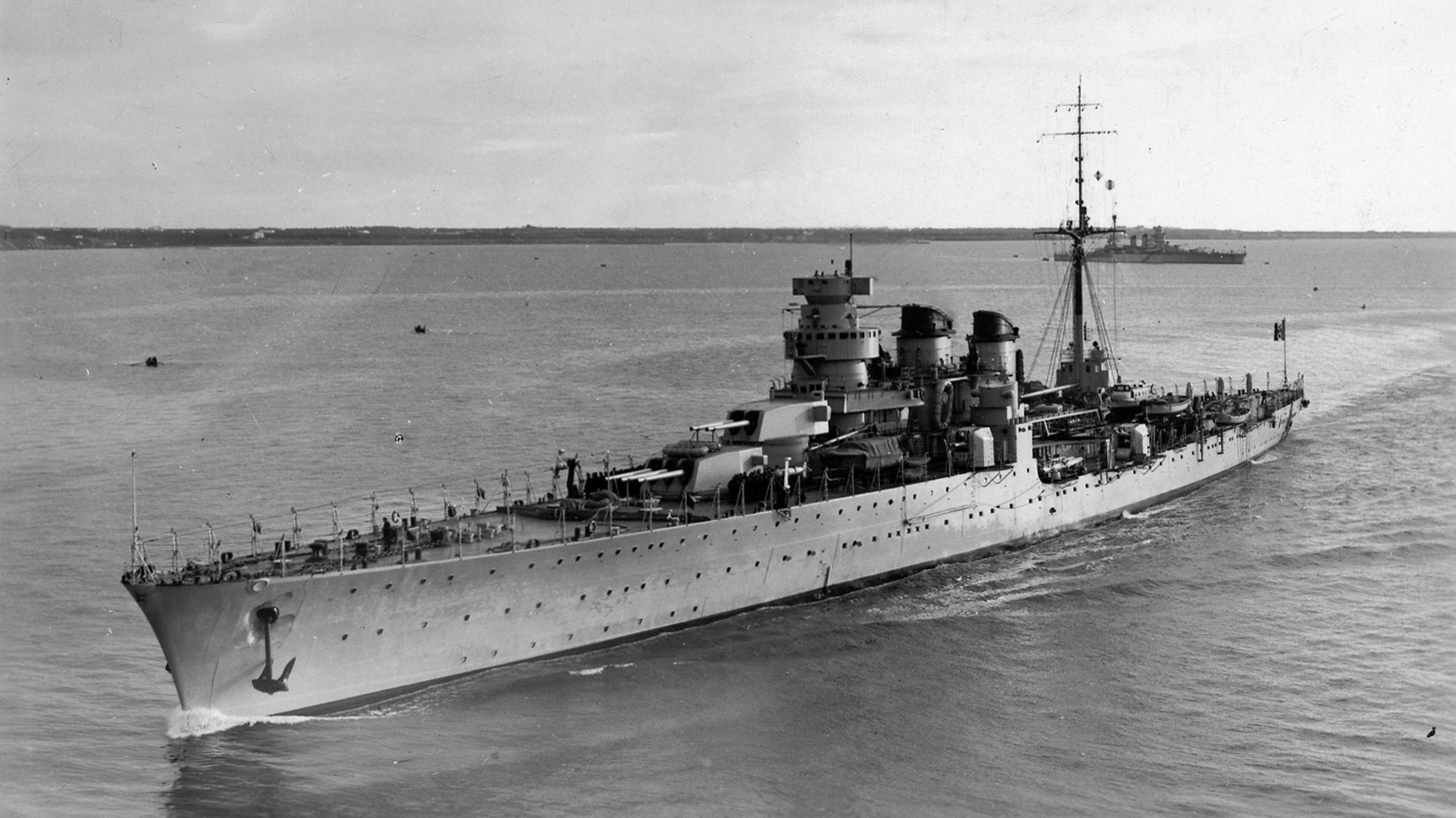
Giuseppe Garibaldi was torpedoed by Wanklyn and damaged in July 1941

On 19 July Upholder left harbour once more, to take part in Operation Substance, which was a supply operation to deliver a much-needed convoy to the island. Wanklyn was moved to guard the south island of Marettimo. Two days later Wanklyn moved to San Vito Lo Capo, on the western tip of Sicily. There, he could cover enemy movements from Palermo. On 24 July he spotted and engaged a transport with a single destroyer escort. He dived and fired three torpedoes at 5,000 yards (4.6 km), one of which struck and his victim, the 5,000-ton Dandolo sank. The destroyer dropped 17 depth charges over two hours and attempted a hydrophone hunt, but Wanklyn dived to 150 feet (46 m) and retired to the north-west. His score now stood at 67,000 tons of enemy shipping sunk.

On 28 July, while in thick fog north of Marettimo, Wanklyn's spotters saw two cruisers supported by destroyers. The escorts were zig-zagging on either side while the cruiser maintained a steady course. It was identified as the Giuseppe Garibaldi, travelling at high speed—the asdic gave a reading of 230 revs indicating 28 knots (52 km/h; 32 mph). Wanklyn had to think quickly if he was not to miss his chance. At 4,000 yards (3.7 km) he fired a spread of four 35-knot (65 km/h; 40 mph) Mark IV torpedoes at 12-second intervals. The submarine dived and the crew clearly heard two explosions. The Garibaldi stopped as her escorts created a smoke screen and dropped depth charges for 45 minutes. The officers of Upholder counted 38. The presence of the escorts and smoke denied the British the chance to assess the results of the attack. Upholder returned to Malta and learned that the operation had been a success.

As the summer progressed, British submariners had noticed how vulnerable Italian coastal railway networks were. On 15 August 1941 Wanklyn and Upholder sailed to the Marittimo area with the hope of landing saboteurs—or train wrecking parties—along the coast to plant explosives along coastal railways. British submarines were now carrying out these operations regularly. Over the closing months of 1941, 12 such operations were carried out. On one occasion a submarine surfaced and shot up a locomotive with its deck gun. Once in the area, Wanklyn was directed onto two convoys and missed them both. On 20 August he moved to the Cape of St Vito. After breakfast he sighted a small cargo vessel and a trawler. Wanklyn ordered two torpedoes fired, one of which hit. The vessel—Enotria—staggered under the blow and sank. The trawler hastily unloaded depth charges and retreated to the west in the direction of Trapani. Wanklyn followed and observed the port under air attack.

Wanklyn moved Upholder back to the Marettimo area. On the afternoon of 22 August lookouts sighted three tankers under escort from three destroyers and a flying boat. Wanklyn targeted the lead ship as the aircraft moved off to the disengaged side of the convoy and the destroyer nearest to him was moving to cover the rear of the convoy. The tanker carried three large drums on its deck and was painted in mauve and khaki dazzle camouflage. Wanklyn ordered a full salvo. Two torpedoes struck the target, the Lussin, which sank with heavy loss of life. Wanklyn noted that the destroyers dropped 43 depth charges in eight minutes, followed by a further 18. The tactics of the Italians were improving. At one point, Upholder was trapped in between two destroyers. Wanklyn believed they were saved because the Italians began their attack at excessive speeds causing them to overshoot by 200 yards (180 m). On 24 August Wanklyn attacked a convoy of ships which included six destroyers two cruisers and a Conte di Cavour-class battleship. At three miles (4.8 km) he could not catch the smaller ships but fired his last two torpedoes at a cruiser. The officers heard one explosion and claimed a cruiser damaged. The escort launched 32 depth charges, some of which came close to Upholder.

The following day Wanklyn dropped a raiding party inland near Palermo. The party failed to find a target and returned after a few skirmishes with Italian patrols. On the way in, Upholder scraped the sea bed and Wanklyn moved the submarine one mile (1.6 km) out. While there he was spotted and experienced fire from the shore. The party returned without loss, having failed in their mission to find a target, and the submarine quickly departed. The risk of being attacked by Italian motor torpedo boats was very high. Urge had better success, when she landed a party that blew up a supply bridge near Taormina. Another unsuccessful patrol followed—their 13th—and they returned on 1 September 1941. During the sortie he engaged the three huge liner-transports Neptunia, Oceania and Marco Polo. He fired all of his torpedoes and all missed and once again Upholder was subjected to counter-attacks. Just 17 days later, Wanklyn would engage two of these vessels again.

=== Neptunia, Oceania, Duisburg convoy ===
The day following their return—2 September 1941—several of the crew received awards. Wanklyn received the Distinguished Service Order. The Victoria Cross award for his sinking of Conte Rosso had not been publicly announced. The London Gazette published the exploits of Wanklyn and he became a well-known figure in Britain and the men were given two weeks leave on Malta. Simpson summoned all of his commanding officers to his harbour headquarters. Upholder, Upright, Ursula and Unbeaten were to patrol the Tripoli sea lanes and intercept the convoy Wanklyn had failed to intercept two weeks earlier. On 16 September Upholder departed Malta. At 3 a.m on the morning of 18 September 1941, Wanklyn received a message from Unbeaten, which had spotted the convoy.

At night as the liners were illuminated by the moon, Wanklyn attacked with four torpedoes. The submarine could only manage 10.5 knots (19.4 km/h; 12.1 mph) and a swell was rocking her from side to side, making aiming difficult. It was too dark to begin a submerged attack against a fast-moving convoy. Wanklyn deduced that the attack must be made at long range, outside the escorts' protective screen. Wanklyn saw that on occasion the targets overlapped, and as they did so he fired at the bow of one and stern of the other. Bringing back the aiming point to the centre of the overlapping mass, he fired two more torpedoes. Two torpedoes struck. The first destroyed the propellers of the Oceania and she stopped dead in the water. The other struck and tore a large hole in Neptunia. The escorts stopped to pick up survivors. Wanklyn retired to a safe distance and reloaded. Closing to finish the crippled Oceania, Wanklyn was forced to crash-dive because of an Italian destroyer. Too close to fire, he continued under the liner and emerged on the other side. There he fired a single torpedo which blew the ship apart and it sank. Unbeaten had arrived and was about to fire but saw the second strike disintegrate the ship, which was carrying several thousand German soldiers. Neptunia limped off with a destroyer at 5 knots (9.3 km/h; 5.8 mph) but her bulkheads collapsed due to the damage and she came to a stop with a single destroyer in attendance. Two more torpedoes from Upholder sank her. Wanklyn had accounted for nearly 40,000 tons in the same attack. The gyro-compass had been put out of action during the action.

Upholder experienced a barren run over the next few weeks. Her next patrol, between 23 September and 2 October, was north of Marittimo and stretching to Cape St Vito. Two weeks later, in mid-October 1941, the boat operated with Urge in the Kerkenah Bank off Tunisia. On the night of 8 November 1941, lookouts spotted a U-boat in the moonlight off Melito di Porto Salvo. Wanklyn determined it was Italian, possibly a Perla, Sirena or Argonauta-class submarine. A full salvo sank the vessel. No survivors were recovered, and only a large oil slick was visible on the surface. Upholder picked up the noise of the enemy vessel breaking apart as it sank.

Just 36 hours later, Wanklyn witnessed the Battle of the Duisburg Convoy. Captain William Gladstone Agnew led Force K—a flotilla of several destroyers—into a surface battle. Speeding up to attack any stragglers, Wanklyn engaged and sank the Italian Maestrale-class destroyer Libeccio. Wanklyn attempted to engage a cruiser but hit an Avieri–class destroyer, which he claimed damaged. During the battle the gyro failed on one of the Upholder torpedoes, which ran in circles and came close to the Upholder before sinking.

=== Last patrols ===
On 25 November 1941 Upholder left for her eighteenth patrol. Wanklyn positioned the submarine south east of the Messina straits. At 07:30 on the 27 November they sighted a large tanker with destroyers for escort. Wanklyn fired a full salvo at 2,800 yards (2.6 km) but underestimated the enemy's speed. This convoy was later intercepted, and the tanker sunk, by Force K. On 29 November Upholder sailed into the midst of an Italian naval squadron on a night exercise. The enemy fleet consisted of three cruisers and five destroyers. With the closest vessel only 3,000 yards (2.7 km) away Wanklyn continued to calculate the bearing and speed of the enemy, until eventually he ordered the boat to dive. He could not see anything through the periscope in the winter night. By using dead-reckoning, he fired off a salvo at the last ship using his asdic. The target disappeared on a reciprocal bearing and then reappeared right over the top of Upholder. Wanklyn docked at Malta on the morning of 21 December 1941.

In Wankln's absence, the BBC had broadcast news of the Victoria Cross award on 11 December. Wanklyn's wife and son, Ian, were presented with the award at the home of her parents in Meigle. Her husband's achievements and records came as shock since all his letters were censored for security reasons. Many newspapers used his picture and interview with the Times of Malta, made earlier in the year, to draw on his account of the sea war. Wanklyn's reserved nature permitted him only to say that he was "exhilarated" by the news. When asked what was most needed in submarine warfare for success, he replied, "That's a nasty one, so I will use a long word: Imperturbability". Wanklyn only became expansive in describing the crew's debt to their cook, an able seaman, who was essential for the crew's welfare. The award was the seventh to be bestowed upon a member of the navy, but the first to the submarine service.

On 31 December Wanklyn put to sea again. He fired three torpedoes at a merchant ship off Cape Gallo but all missed and one exploded upon hitting the shore. West of Palermo on 4 January 1942, Upholder engaged the Italian merchant Sirio. The first two torpedoes failed, and one fell to the sea bed and exploded under Upholder causing no serious damage. Closing to 1,000 yoctoares (1.1×10^{−18} sq ft), Wanklyn ordered two more firings. One torpedo struck amidships. The heavily damaged vessel stopped to lower some lifeboats, but then continued on. Wanklyn surfaced to destroy her with the deck gun but was forced under again when the ship returned fire with deck armament. Sirio soon picked up speed and escaped. The following night off Messina, Wanklyn attacked an enemy submarine with his last torpedo. His victim, the Ammiraglio Saint, was lost. The men standing on the conning tower survived: Lieutenant Como, Petty Officer and Telegraphist Valentino Chico and Torpedoman Ernst Fiore. They were willing to identify their boat to their captors and described their vessel as a 1,500 ton submarine. Wanklyn made for port. On the journey the submarine was attacked by Junkers Ju 88s which landed bombs 200 yards (180 m) off the vessel's starboard quarter. Once docked, Wanklyn was ordered on a months leave. Commander Pat Norman took command of her for a patrol during which he sank the armed trawler Aosta on 8 February.

On 21 February 1942 Wanklyn took command again. Simpson ordered her to participate in operations of the Libyan coast. On the morning of 23 February, Upholder took up her position off Misurata. Wanklyn pursued two ships until he realised they were destroyers. On 26 February Upholder picked up a contact of Sidi Blal. He closed to attack on the surface before appreciating his error—his quarry was another destroyer. Wanklyn ordered the boat to dive. Apparently they had sailed so close Wanklyn saw the sparkle of a cigarette thrown from the destroyer. Off Tripoli Upholder intercepted the transport Tembien and her single destroyer escort. Wanklyn ordered three torpedoes fired and three hit. The cargo ship sank in twenty minutes. From 28 February—3 March, no more vessels were encountered and Wanklyn docked in Malta on 5 March. Tembien was carrying 468 Allied prisoners of war, a fact known to the British through Ultra decryptions. Her sinking caused the deaths of at least 390 prisoners and 78 crew and guards.

On 14 March 1942, Wanklyn departed on his 27th patrol in the Gulf of Taranto. On the night of the 18 March he sighted a submarine on the surface and determined her to be hostile. He engaged with a full spread of torpedoes, and the submarine blew apart and sank. The submarine, later identified as the Tricheco, was lost with all hands. There was no counterattack, but motor torpedo boats shadowed her movements for hours which ran down her battery and oxygen. The following day Wanklyn moved to St Cataldo Point hoping to find a softer target for his deck gun. The lookouts sighted four vessels, a trawler and three fishing smacks. Wanklyn ordered the submarine to surface 100 yards (91 m) from the trawler, Maria. His officers gestured to the crew to abandon ship and Upholder fired seven shells into the vessel which sank. The smacks fled close to shore. The action had lasted 14 minutes and Wanklyn decided it was too dangerous to give chase. On 23 March Upholder, Proteus and P36 loitered off Taranto in the hope of engaging Italian warships. One convoy was sighted and Wanklyn fired on a light cruiser but missed. All three returned to Malta without success.

== Death ==
Wanklyn is believed to have been killed along with his crew when Upholder was lost on her 25th patrol, becoming overdue on 14 April 1942. The most likely explanation is that she fell victim to depth charges dropped by the Italian torpedo boat Pegaso north east of Tripoli on 14 April 1942, although no debris was seen on the surface. The attack was 100 miles (160 km) away from Wanklyn's patrol area; it is thought that he may have changed position to find more targets. It is also possible that the submarine was sunk by a mine on 11 April 1942 near Tripoli, when a submarine was reported as approaching a minefield. More recent research carried out by Italian naval specialist Francesco Mattesini points to a German aerial patrol supporting the same convoy, composed of two Dornier Do 17s and two Messerschmitt Bf 110s, which attacked an underwater contact with bombs two hours before the Pegaso incident. The author also asserts that the seaplane crew was unsure if the target they pinpointed to Pegaso was a submarine or a school of dolphins. Mattesini, however, admits the possibility that Pegaso could have finished off the submarine previously damaged by the German aircraft. Wanklyn was the Allies' most successful submariner in terms of tonnage sunk.

== Ships sunk ==
Date	Ship	Combatant	Tonnage	Fate
18 July 1940	UJ-126 later Steiermark	Kriegsmarine	455	sunk at 58°28′N 05°01′E
28 January 1941	Duisburg	Kriegsmarine	7,400	damaged
25 April 1941	Antonietta Lauro	Regia Marina	5,500	sunk at 34°57′N 11°44′E
26 April 1941	Arta	Kriegsmarine	2,500	destroyed with charges 34°54′N 11°37′E
1 May 1941	Arcturus	Kriegsmarine	2,500	sunk at 34°38′N 11°39′E
1 May 1941	Leverkusen	Kriegsmarine	7,400	sunk at 34°38′N 11°39′E
20 May 1941	Bainsizza	Regia Marina	4,000	damaged Strait of Messina
23 May 1941	Capitaine Damiani	Vichy France	5,000	sunk 37°56′N 15°36′E
24 May 1941	SS Conte Rosso	Regia Marina	18,000	sunk at 36°41′N 15°42′E
3 July 1941	Laura C	Regia Marina	6,100	sunk at 37°55′N 15°44′E
24 July 1941	Dandolo	Regia Marina	5,000	damaged at 38°08′N 12°37′E
28 July 1941	Giuseppe Garibaldi	Regia Marina	9,000	damaged at 38°04′N 11°57′E
20 August 1941	Enotria	Regia Marina	500	sunk at 38°09′N 12°39′E
22 August 1941	Lussin	Regia Marina	4,000	sunk
22 August 1941	Tarvisio	Regia Marina	unknown	damaged
18 September 1941	Neptunia	Regia Marina	19,500	sunk at 33°01′N 14°49′E
18 September 1941	Oceania	Regia Marina	19,500	sunk at 33°01′N 14°49′E
8 November 1941	Italian submarine "Luigi Settembrini"	Regia Marina	1,600	missed
9 November 1941	Italian destroyer Libeccio	Regia Marina	1,600	sunk at 36°50′N 18°10′E
4 January 1942	Sirio	Regia Marina	5,300	damaged at 38°07′N 35°52′E
5 January 1942	Ammiraglio Saint	Regia Marina	1,500	sunk at 38°22′N 15°22′E
27 February 1942	Tembien	Regia Marina	5,500	sunk at 32°55′N 12°42′E
18 March 1942	Italian submarine Tricheco	Regia Marina	800	sunk at 40°42′N 17°57′E
19 March 1942	B.14/Maria	Regia Marina	25	sunk at 40°18′N 18°28′E

== See also ==
- List of people who disappeared mysteriously at sea
- Media related to David Wanklyn at Wikimedia Commons
