= SS Conte Rosso =

Italian transatlantic ocean liner

Coordinates: 36°41′N 15°42′E

- Conte Rosso

History

Italy
- Name: Conte Rosso
- Namesake: Amadeus VII, Count of Savoy
- Owner: Lloyd Sabaudo Line (1922–32); Flotte Riunite (1932–34); Lloyd Triestino (1934–41)
- Port of registry: Genoa (until 1932); Trieste (1933 onward)
- Builder: William Beardmore & Co, Dalmuir
- Yard number: 611
- Launched: 10 February 1921
- Completed: 14 March 1922
- Maiden voyage: 17 May 1922
- Identification: code letters NLVH (until 1933); call sign IBEI (1934 onward)
- Fate: Sunk 24 May 1941

General characteristics
- Type: Ocean liner
- Tonnage: 18,500 GRT
- Length: 180 m (590 ft 7 in) o/a; 173.8 m (570.2 ft) p/p
- Beam: 22.5 m (73 ft 10 in)
- Draught: 9.1 m (30 ft)
- Depth: 10.9 m (35.9 ft)
- Installed power: 18,500 hp (13,795 kW); 3,650 NHP
- Propulsion: 4 steam turbines; 2 screws
- Speed: 21 knots (39 km/h)
- Capacity: 1,500 tons cargo; 1,950 passengers: 200 1st class; 250 2nd class; 1,500 steerage
- Notes: sister ship: Conte Verde

SS Conte Rosso was an Italian transatlantic ocean liner that was built in Scotland in 1921–22. The vessel became a troop ship in the 1930s and was sunk by the submarine HMS Upholder in 1941.

She was named after Amadeus VII, Count of Savoy, the so-called "Red Count", and was noted for her lavish Italian interior decoration. Because much of its sailing would be in warmer waters, the designers included an outdoor dining area, unusual for ships of this era.

Conte Rosso had a sister ship, Conte Verde.

== Building ==
William Beardmore and Company built the ship in Dalmuir, Glasgow for the Italian Lloyd Sabaudo Line. She was launched on 10 February 1921 and completed on 14 March 1922.

Conte Rosso was 173.8 m (570.2 ft) long between perpendiculars, had a beam of 22.5 m (74 ft) and her gross register tonnage was 17,857. She had four steam turbines driving two screws by double reduction gearing.

Conte Rosso's code letters were NJVH until they were superseded in 1934 by the maritime call sign IBEI.

== Service history ==
She entered service in 1922 carrying passengers between Italy and New York City. She was the first new transatlantic liner built after World War I and the largest Italian liner to date.

In 1928 she was replaced on the New York route by the newer Conte Grande and began service between Italy and South America.

In 1932 Lloyd Sabaudo merged with Navigazione Generale Italiana and Cosulich Line to form Flotte Riunite. Flotte Riunite transferred Conte Rosso to the Trieste – Bombay – Shanghai route. After 1933 this became one of the major escape routes for the Jewish population of Germany and Austria as Shanghai was one of the few places that did not require paid emigration visas.

Conte Rosso served as an Italian troop ship during the Second Italo-Ethiopian War in the 1930s.

== Sinking ==
In World War II the Italian Government again used Conte Rosso as a troop ship. On 24 May 1941 the Royal Navy submarine HMS Upholder sank her by torpedo 16 km (9 nautical miles) off the coast of Sicily while in convoy from Naples to Tripoli. Of the 2,729 soldiers and crew aboard, 1,297 were killed.

== See also ==
- David Wanklyn
- List by death toll of ships sunk by submarines

== Bibliography ==
- Allaway, Jim (2004). "Chapter 17: The Sinking of the Conte Rosso". Hero of the Upholder. Penzance: Periscope Publishing Ltd. pp. 103–107. ISBN 978-1-904381-23-5.
