= HMS Upholder (P37) =

Submarine of the Royal Navy

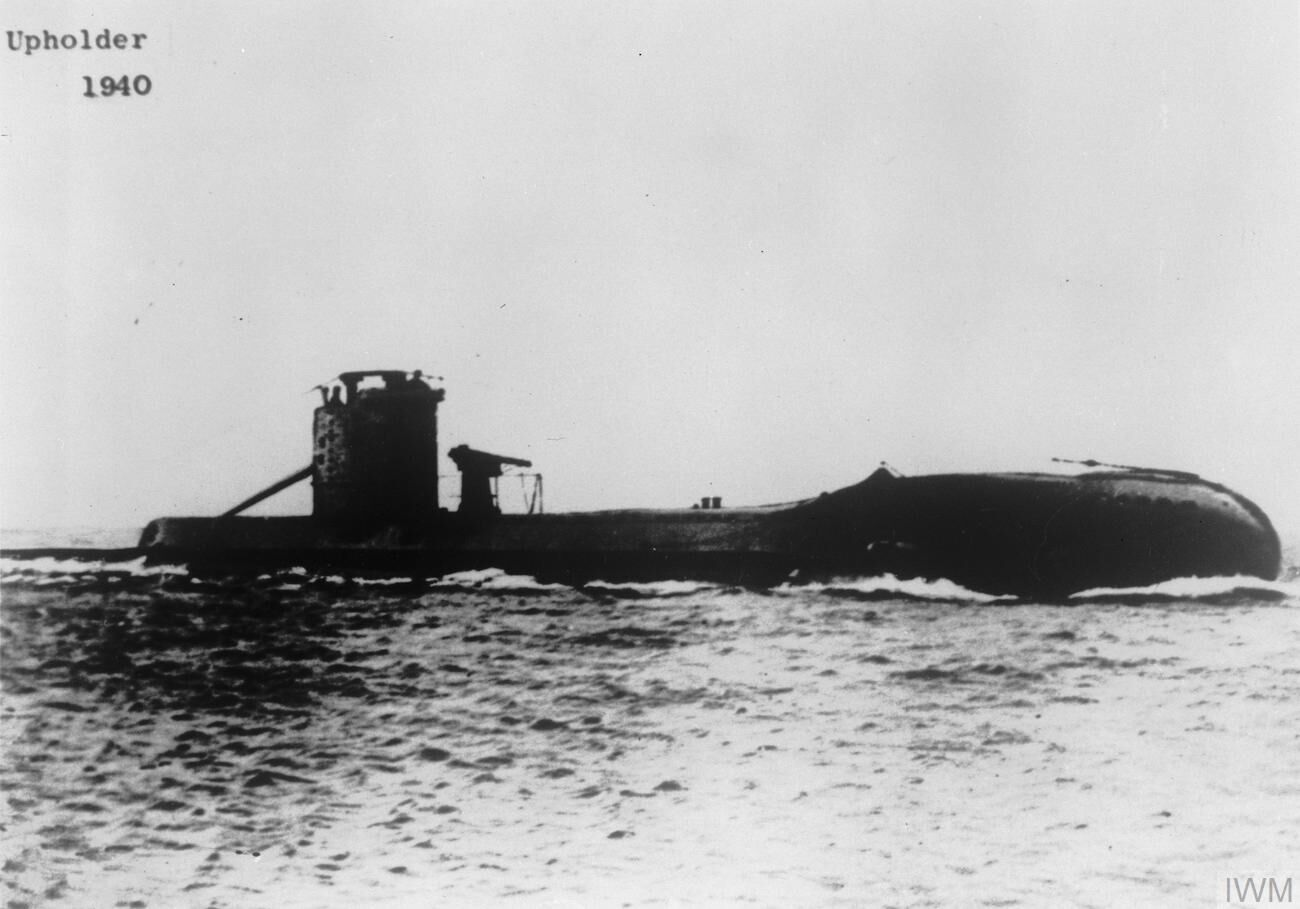
- HMS Upholder

History

United Kingdom
- Name: HMS Upholder
- Builder: Vickers-Armstrongs, Barrow-in-Furness
- Laid down: 30 October 1939
- Launched: 8 July 1940
- Commissioned: 31 October 1940
- Identification: Pennant number: P37
- Fate: lost 14 April 1942
- Badge

General characteristics
- Displacement: Surfaced – 540 tons standard, 630 tons full load; Submerged – 730 tons
- Length: 191 ft (58.22 m)
- Beam: 16 ft 1 in (4.90 m)
- Draught: 15 ft 2 in (4.62 m)
- Propulsion: 2 shaft diesel-electric; 2 Paxman Ricardo diesel generators + electric motors; 615 / 825 hp
- Speed: 11 1/4 knots (20.8 km/h) max. surfaced; 10 knots (19 km/h) max. submerged
- Complement: 27–31
- Armament: 4 × bow internal 21 inch (533 mm) torpedo tubes, 2 external; 10 torpedoes; 1 × QF 3-inch 20 cwt gun

HMS Upholder (P37) was a Royal Navy U-class submarine built by Vickers-Armstrongs at Barrow-in-Furness. She was laid down on 30 October 1939, launched on 8 July 1940 by Mrs. Doris Thompson, wife of a director of the builders. The submarine was commissioned on 31 October 1940. She was one of four U-class submarines which had two external torpedo tubes at the bows in addition to the 4 internal ones fitted to all boats. They were excluded from the others because they interfered with depth-keeping at periscope depth.

== Career ==
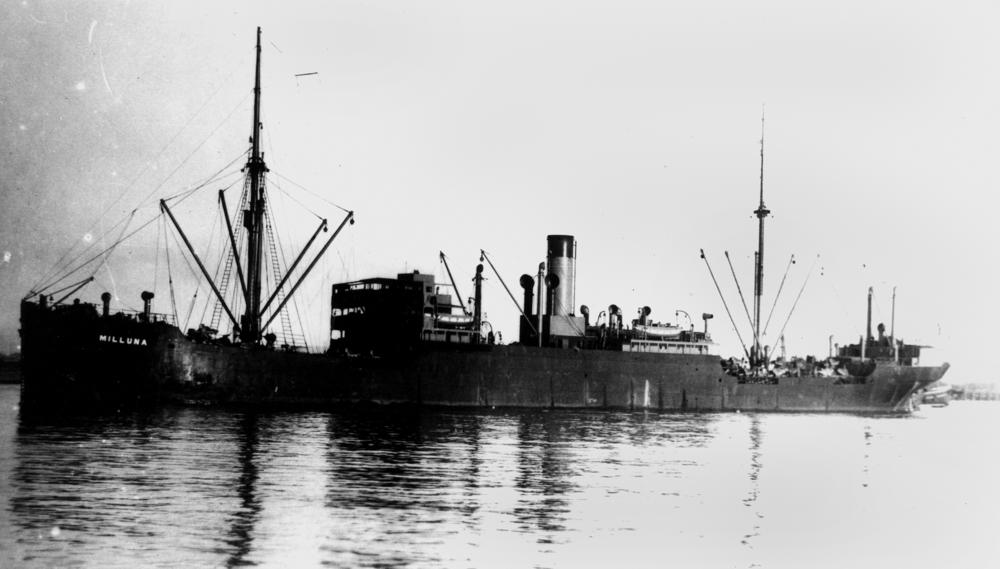
The Italian cargo ship Tembien, which Upholder sank in 1942 with the loss of almost 500 men

She was commanded for her entire career by Lieutenant-Commander Malcolm David Wanklyn, and became the most successful British submarine of the Second World War. After a working up period, she left for Malta on 10 December 1940 and was attached to the 10th Submarine Flotilla based there. She completed 24 patrols, sinking 93,031 tons of enemy shipping including four warships; the destroyer Libeccio after the Battle of the Duisburg Convoy, two submarines (Tricheco and Ammiraglio Saint-Bon) and an auxiliary minesweeper, and ten merchant ships; three troopships, six cargo ships, and an auxiliary transport.

Wanklyn was awarded the Victoria Cross for a patrol in her in 1941, which included an attack on a particularly well-defended convoy on 24 May 1941 in which Upholder sank the 17,879 GRT Italian troop ship Conte Rosso. On 28 July 1941 she damaged the Giuseppe Garibaldi (9500 tons). On 18 September 1941 she sank two troopships within hours of each other: the sister ships Neptunia (19,475 GRT) and Oceania (19,507 GRT).

Upholder also damaged the German freighter Duisburg (7,389 GRT), the French tanker Capitaine Damiani (4,818 GRT), the Italian freighters Dandolo (4,964 GRT) and Sirio (5,223 GRT) and destroyed the wreck of the German freighter Arta (2,425 GRT) already grounded after the battle of the Tarigo Convoy.

=== Successes ===
Ships sunk by Upholder (Note: Merchant ship tonnages are in gross register tons. Military vessels are listed by tons displacement.)
Date	Ship	Flag	GRT/LT	Notes
25 April 1941	Antonietta Lauro	Merchant Navy	5,428 GRT	Freighter; 4 men killed
1 May	Arcturus	Nazi Germany	2,576 GRT	Freighter
1 May	Leverkusen	Nazi Germany	7,382 GRT	Freighter
24 May	Conte Rosso	Merchant Navy	17,789 GRT	Troopship; 1,297 men killed and 1,432 rescued
3 July	Laura C.	Merchant Navy	6,181 GRT	Freighter; 6 men killed and 32 survivors
20 August	Enotria	Merchant Navy	852 GRT	Freighter; 2 men killed
22 August	Lussin	Kingdom of Italy	3,988 GRT	Navy transport; 83 survivors
18 September	Neptunia	Merchant Navy	19,475 GRT	Troopship; with Oceania 384 men killed, 5,434 men saved.
18 September	Oceania	Merchant Navy	19,507 GRT	Troopship; with Neptunia 384 men killed, 5,434 men saved.
9 November	Libeccio	Kingdom of Italy	1,615 LT	Destroyer; 27 men killed
5 January 1942	Ammiraglio Saint Bon	Kingdom of Italy	1,461 LT	Submarine; 59 men killed, 3 survivors
27 February	Tembien	Merchant Navy	5,584 GRT	Freighter; 497 men killed (419 British POW); 157 men rescued (78 POW).
18 March	Tricheco	Kingdom of Italy	810 LT	Submarine; 38 men killed and 11 survivors.
19 March	B 14 Maria	Kingdom of Italy	22 GRT	Auxiliary minesweeper.
Total:			93,031 GRT	

== Sinking ==
Upholder was lost with all hands on her 25th patrol, which was to have been her last before she returned to England. She left for patrol on 6 April 1942 and became overdue on 14 April. On 12 April she was ordered, with HMS Urge and HMS Thrasher to form a patrol line to intercept a convoy, but it is not known whether she received the signal.

=== Theories about the loss ===
Italian torpedo boat Pegaso, which may have sunk HMS Upholder off Tripoli

The most likely explanation for her loss is that after being spotted by a reconnaissance seaplane, she fell victim to depth charges dropped by the Italian torpedo boat Pegaso northeast of Tripoli on 14 April 1942 in the position 34°47′N 15°55′E, although no debris was seen on the surface. The attack was 100 nmi (190 km; 120 mi) north-east from Wanklyn's patrol area and he may have changed position to find more targets. It is also possible that the submarine was sunk by a mine on 11 April 1942 near Tripoli, when a submarine was reported close to a minefield. A third and less likely theory came from an alleged air and surface attack on a submarine contact by German aircraft and the escort of a convoy on 14 April off Misrata, but no official Axis record of this action was found after the end of the war.

More recent research carried out by Italian naval specialist Francesco Mattesini points to a German aerial patrol supporting the same convoy, comprising two Dornier Do 17 and two Messerschmitt Bf 110 aircraft, that attacked an underwater contact with bombs two hours before the Pegaso incident. The author asserts that the seaplane crew was unsure if the target they pinpointed to Pegaso was a submarine or a school of dolphins. Mattesini admits the possibility that Pegaso could have finished off the submarine damaged by the German aircraft.

The Canadian naval researcher Platon Alexiades has concluded that the Pegaso and German aircraft claims can be dismissed outright. Scrutiny of British records show that submarine could not have been in the positions where these attacks occurred. Following an ULTRA intercept and a signal from Captain S.10 (the 10th flotilla commander), it is most likely that Upholder was lost on a mine as she was proceeding to intercept the Monreale/Unione convoy on 13 April. Her likely route would have brought her close to an Italian minefield laid by the destroyers Alvise Da Mosto and Giovanni da Verrazzano on 1st May 1941 (section d AN of the "T" minefield) some 15 miles north of Tripoli.

=== Tribute ===
When, on 22 August 1942, the Admiralty announced her loss, the communiqué carried with it an unusual tribute to Wanklyn and his men,

It is seldom proper for Their Lordships to draw distinction between different services rendered in the course of naval duty, but they take this opportunity of singling out those of HMS Upholder, under the command of Lt.Cdr. David Wanklyn, for special mention. She was long employed against enemy communications in the Central Mediterranean, and she became noted for the uniformly high quality of her services in that arduous and dangerous duty. Such was the standard of skill and daring set by Lt.Cdr. Wanklyn and the officers and men under him that they and their ship became an inspiration not only to their own flotilla, but to the Fleet of which it was a part and to Malta, where for so long HMS Upholder was based. The ship and her company are gone, but the example and inspiration remain.

Upholder was credited with having sunk 97,000 tons of shipping, in addition to three U-boats and one destroyer.

Quoted by Admiral of the Fleet, The Lord Fieldhouse GCB, GBE probably during the Falklands War, "I can do no better than repeat the unique message following the sinking of HMS Upholder on April 14th 1942 : 'The ship and her company are gone but the example and inspiration remain".
