= SS Conte Grande =

Italian ocean liner

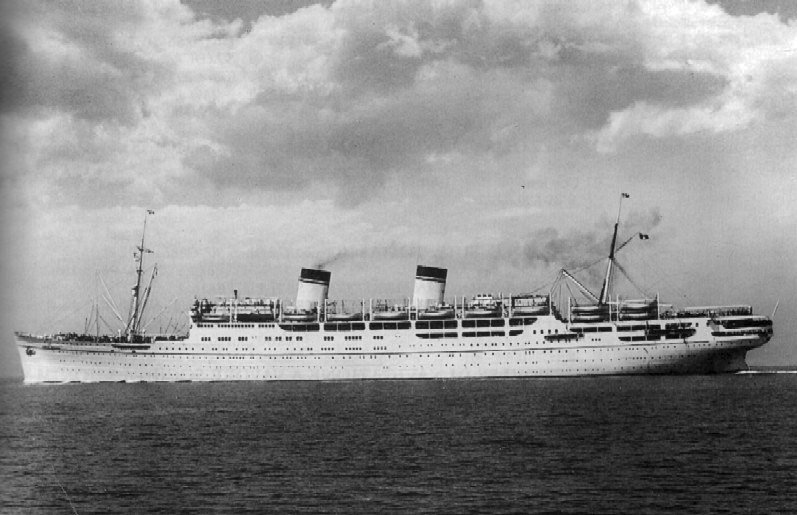
- Conte Grande in commercial service after World War II.

History
- Name: Conte Grande
- Owner: Lloyd Sabaudo Line / Italian Line
- Builder: Stabilimento Tecnico Triestino
- Launched: 29 June 1927
- Maiden voyage: 13 April 1928
- Fate: Scrapped, 1961

General characteristics
- Tonnage: 25,661 GRT, 15,303 NRT
- Displacement: 22,800 tons
- Length: 198.9 m (652 ft 7 in)
- Beam: 23.8 m (78 ft 1 in)
- Propulsion: Parsons type turbine, twin screws, 24,000 hp (18,000 kW)
- Speed: ~20 knots (37 km/h; 23 mph) (sources vary)
- Capacity: 1,718 passengers

SS Conte Grande was a Lloyd Sabaudo ocean liner built in 1927 by Stabilimento Tecnico Triestino in Trieste, Italy, to service the transatlantic passenger line between Genoa, Italy, and New York City. Launched on 29 June 1927, her maiden voyage was from Genoa to Naples to New York City, which occurred on 13 April 1928. In 1932, after acquisition by the Italian Line, she was transferred to the South America service but was laid up in Santos, Brazil in 1940.

During World War II, she was acquired by the United States and was used as an American troopship—renamed USS Monticello (AP-61) in 1942. After the war, in 1947, she was returned to the Italian Line and renamed Conte Grande. After a two-year hiatus, in 1949, she resumed service to South America. In 1960, she was transferred from the Italian Line to Lloyd Triestino (also chartered by Italian Line), where she served for another year until being scrapped in 1961. Her sister ship was the SS Conte Biancamano.

== Beginnings ==
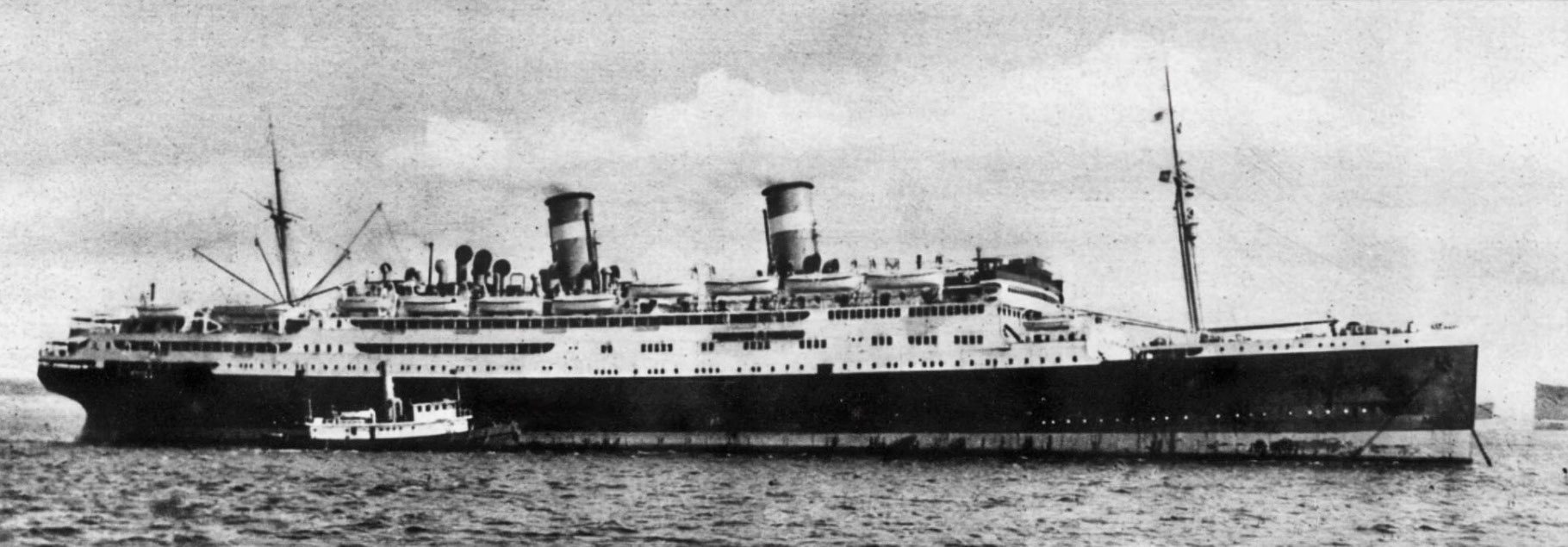
The SS Conte Grand arriving in New York on her maiden voyage

Conte Grande was built by Stabilimento Tecnico Triestino at Trieste as an Italian-flagged passenger ship. She was launched on 28 June 1927 and entered service with Lloyd Sabaudo of Genoa at Cantieri San Marco for service on the North Atlantic tourist and passenger trade. In 1933 she transferred to the South American tourist trade. Early in June 1940 the Conte Grande was in Santos, Brazil, on one of her regular South American cruises. Here her officers held her awaiting developments after Mussolini's attack on France on 10 June 1940. On 27 February 1942 she was transferred to Brazilian registry and a Brazilian crew replaced the Italian crew who were interned. She was purchased on 16 April 1942 by the United States and renamed USS Monticello. She was commissioned the same day at São Paulo in Brazil under the command of Captain Morton L. Deyo, USN.

== World War II ==
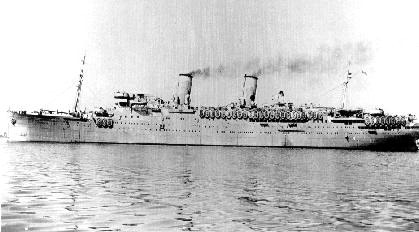
USS Monticello (AP-61)

The USS Monticello sailed north under the escort of the destroyer USS Lansdale to Philadelphia for conversion to a troop transport which was completed 10 September 1942. She left New York on 2 November for Operation Torch, the invasion of North Africa, carrying troops to Casablanca. Returning to New York, she sailed again on 25 December, carrying men for the various commands of the China-Burma-India Theater to Karachi, by way of the Panama Canal, Australia, and Ceylon.

The transport returned to New York on 24 April 1943, carried reinforcements to Oran on two voyages, then sailed from Africa to San Francisco by way of the Panama Canal. Through the first half of 1944, she carried men from San Francisco to Californian ports, Australia, Hawaii, and the burgeoning bases of the South Pacific. In June 1944, she began the first of a series of transatlantic voyages bringing men to win victory in Europe. She reported to New York for an eight-week availability on 20 July 1945 and while there her Navy crew transferred off and were replaced by a Coast Guard crew beginning on 21 July 1945. Her first Coast Guard commanding officer was Commander George R. Leslie. He took command on 6 August 1945 and was replaced the next day by Captain R. S. Patch, USCG.

== Postwar service ==
The vessel remained under repair at Todd's Shipyards, Brooklyn, until 2 October. During this time all of her armament was removed. She departed New York, bound for Naples, on 8 October 1945, with 176 Italian officers, 5,590 Italian Army enlisted men, 13 U.S. Army officers and 34 Army enlisted men, a total of 5,813. She arrived at Naples safely on 19 October. She departed Naples on 22 October and arrived in Norfolk, Virginia on 3 November 1945. She departed Norfolk on 8 November and arrived at Le Havre, France on the 17th. She departed Le Havre on 19 November and arrived back at her home port of New York on 27 November. She then departed New York on 10 December, bound for Marseille, arriving there on 20 December. She departed Marseille on 22 December, arriving at New York on 1 January 1946.

== Decommission and transfer ==
She decommissioned at Norfolk on 22 March 1946 and returned to the War Shipping Administration for disposal on 27 May 1946. She was returned to the Italian government in June 1947, redubbed Conte Grande, and after being laid up for two years, resumed service as a passenger vessel in South America. She was scrapped in 1961.

== Awards ==
Monticello earned one battle star for the World War II service.
