= SS Conte Verde =

Italian ocean liner (1922–1949)

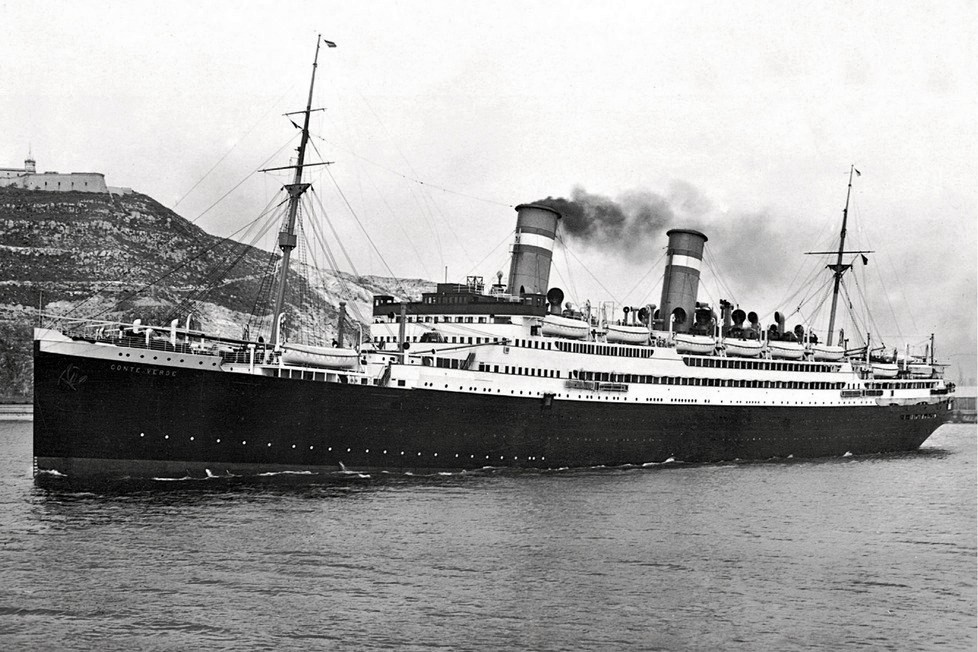
- SS Conte Verde in 1923

History

Italy
- Name: Conte Verde
- Namesake: Amadeus VI, Count of Savoy
- Operator: 1925-1932: Lloyd Sabaudo; 1932-1943: Lloyd Triestino
- Port of registry: Genoa, Italy
- Builder: William Beardmore & Co. of Glasgow
- Yard number: 612
- Laid down: 16 January 1920
- Launched: 21 October 1922
- Completed: 4 April 1923
- Maiden voyage: 21 April 1923
- Fate: Scrapped in 1949

General characteristics
- Type: Ocean liner
- Tonnage: 18,761 GRT
- Length: 180.10 m (590.87 ft)
- Beam: 22.6 m (74 ft 2 in)
- Decks: 10
- Installed power: 3,650 nhp
- Propulsion: steam turbines double reduction unit and two propellers
- Speed: 18.5 knots (34.3 km/h; 21.3 mph)
- Capacity: 450 1st class; 200 2nd class; 1,780 3rd class (emigrants' rooms)
- Crew: 400 total

SS Conte Verde was an Italian ocean liner active in the early 20th century.

The name was chosen in honor of Amadeus VI, Count of Savoy, the so-called "Green Count." She was launched in 1923 at the shipyard of William Beardmore and Company in Dalmuir, Scotland. Her yard number was 612. The ship was a transatlantic liner of 18,761 gross register tons (GRT), ordered by the Italian shipping company Lloyd Sabaudo Line in Genoa. The first-class accommodations had a capacity of 450 passengers, second class was 200 passengers, and third class (emigrants rooms) was 1,780 passengers. In addition, 400 crew members were on board. The ship was composed of 10 decks. The interiors of public rooms were designed in luxurious Italian classical styles. Her sister ship was SS Conte Rosso.

== Lloyd Sabaudo's Transatlantic Line ==
She started her maiden voyage from Genoa to Buenos Aires on 21 April 1923. She set sail for New York on 13 June 1923. One of her most famous voyages was when she brought the national association football teams of Romania, France, Yugoslavia, Belgium and Brazil to Uruguay to participate in the 1930 FIFA World Cup. The Romanian team boarded in Genoa, the French delegation (including FIFA president Jules Rimet) and Yugoslav team boarded in Villefranche-sur-Mer, the Belgian team boarded in Barcelona, and the Brazilian team boarded in Rio de Janeiro. The trophy and three referees, Jean Langenus, Henri Christophe, and Thomas Balvay also crossed the Atlantic Ocean on the ship. Other celebrities who sailed on the Conte Verde include Carlos Gardel a tango singer, Fyodor Chaliapin, a Russian opera singer, Josephine Baker, an American dancer, Fosco Maraini, an Italian academic of Tibetan and Japanese studies as well as a photographer and mountaineer, and Dacia Maraini, an Italian writer. Giovanni Giotta, owner of a famous San Francisco café, the Caffe Trieste founded in 1956, was a member of the ship's crew.

== Lloyd Triestino's Far East Line ==
After acquisition by Italian Line in 1932, she became a part of Lloyd Triestino (also chartered by Italian Line) for service between Trieste and Shanghai via Suez, Bombay, Colombo, Singapore and Hong Kong in 24 days. [2] For this transfer, she was thoroughly refitted. The first-, second- and third-class accommodations were reduced in capacity to 250, 170 and 220 passengers, respectively, to create wider spaces.

On 1 September 1937, she collided with NYK’s Asama Maru in an extraordinarily large typhoon in Hong Kong. She had run aground off the shores of Cape Collinson, and Asama Maru was at the northernmost part of Chai Wan Bay. The work of refloating Conte Verde required one month, and Asama Maru took half a year.

From 1938 to 1940, the four Lloyd Triestino ships brought a number of Jewish refugees from Germany and Austria to Shanghai. Nazi persecution intensified especially after Kristallnacht on 9 November 1938. Then the number of the refugees increased dramatically as the ships became their lifeboats. Ultimately, 17,000 Jewish refugees came to Shanghai on the Lloyd Triestino’s ships. The refugee route via the ships was closed on 10 June 1940, when Italy joined the war. The liners’ operation was suspended indefinitely, and Conte Verde was confined to Shanghai.

== Exchange ship ==
In December 1941, Japan declared war on the Allies. In May 1942, Japan and the US agreed to exchange interned diplomats and other citizens, chartering three ships—Conte Verde (known as Teikyo Maru while chartered), Asama Maru and Gripsholm—for this purpose. Conte Verde and Asama Maru were sent by Japan, and Gripsholm by the US. They met at Lourenco Marques, exchanged the internees and returned. The Conte Verde and Asama Maru were moored at Yokohama while waiting for the second exchange voyage, but negotiations between Japan and the US collapsed. Conte Verde left Yokohama in September and returned to Shanghai.

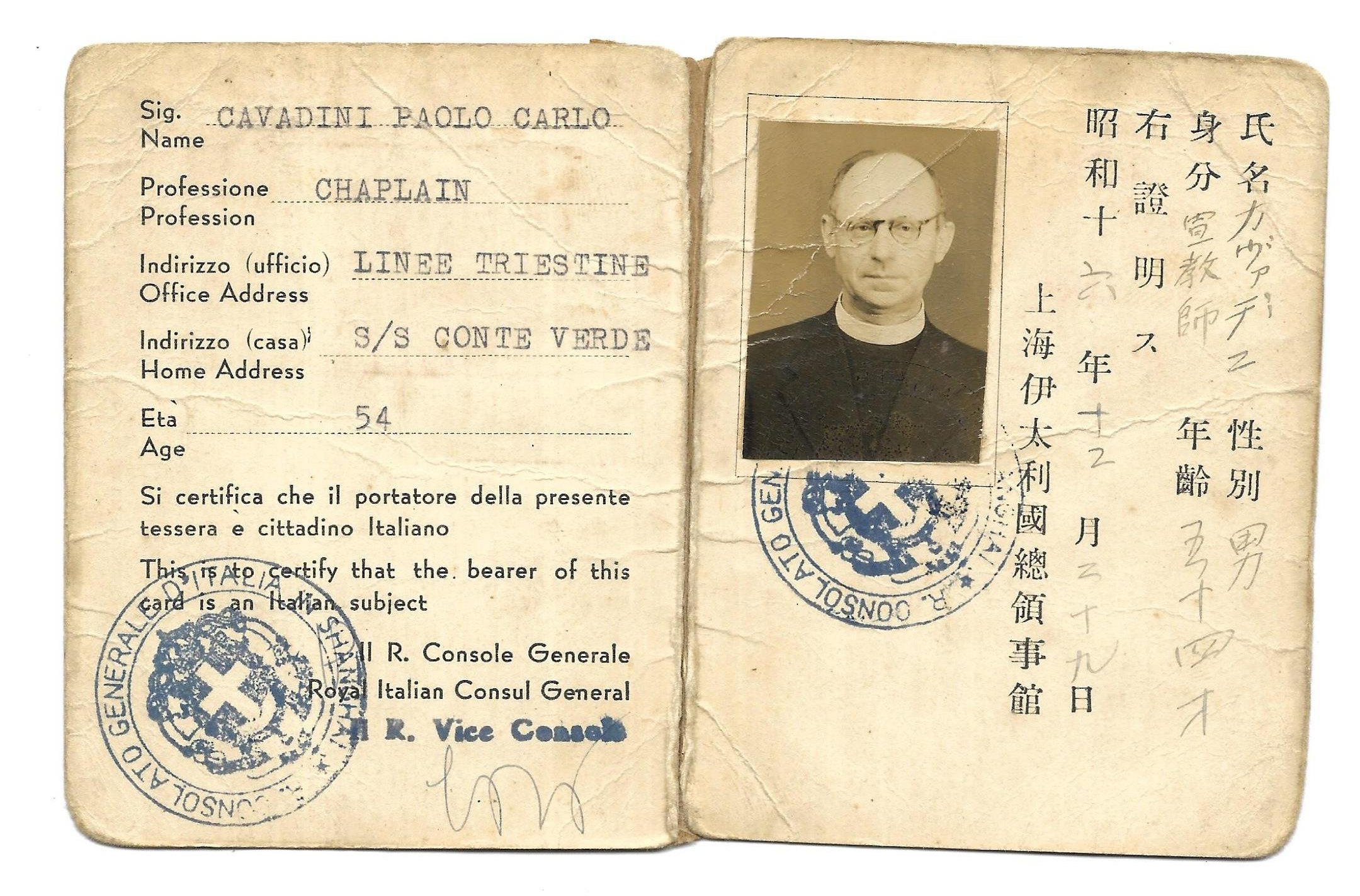
1941 Italian consular ID issued to the chaplain of Conte Verde, Shanghai.

== Sinking ==
Due to the Italian Armistice in 1943, Conte Verde was scuttled at Shanghai by her Italian crew to prevent seizure by Japanese forces, preventing ships from entering or leaving a Japanese naval yard where ships were being repaired, until the wreck was raised in July 1944. She was then bombed and sunk by a B-24 aircraft of the 373rd Bomb Squadron on 8 August before being raised and repaired once more. The vessel was then renamed Kotobuki Maru, converted into a troopship, and towed to Maizuru, a port town in the north of Kyoto Prefecture in June 1945, before being beached by damage from an aircraft raid on 25 July, and was finally scrapped in 1949.

== See also ==
- Augustin Chantrel
