= SS Tembien =

Italian steamship sunk during WW2

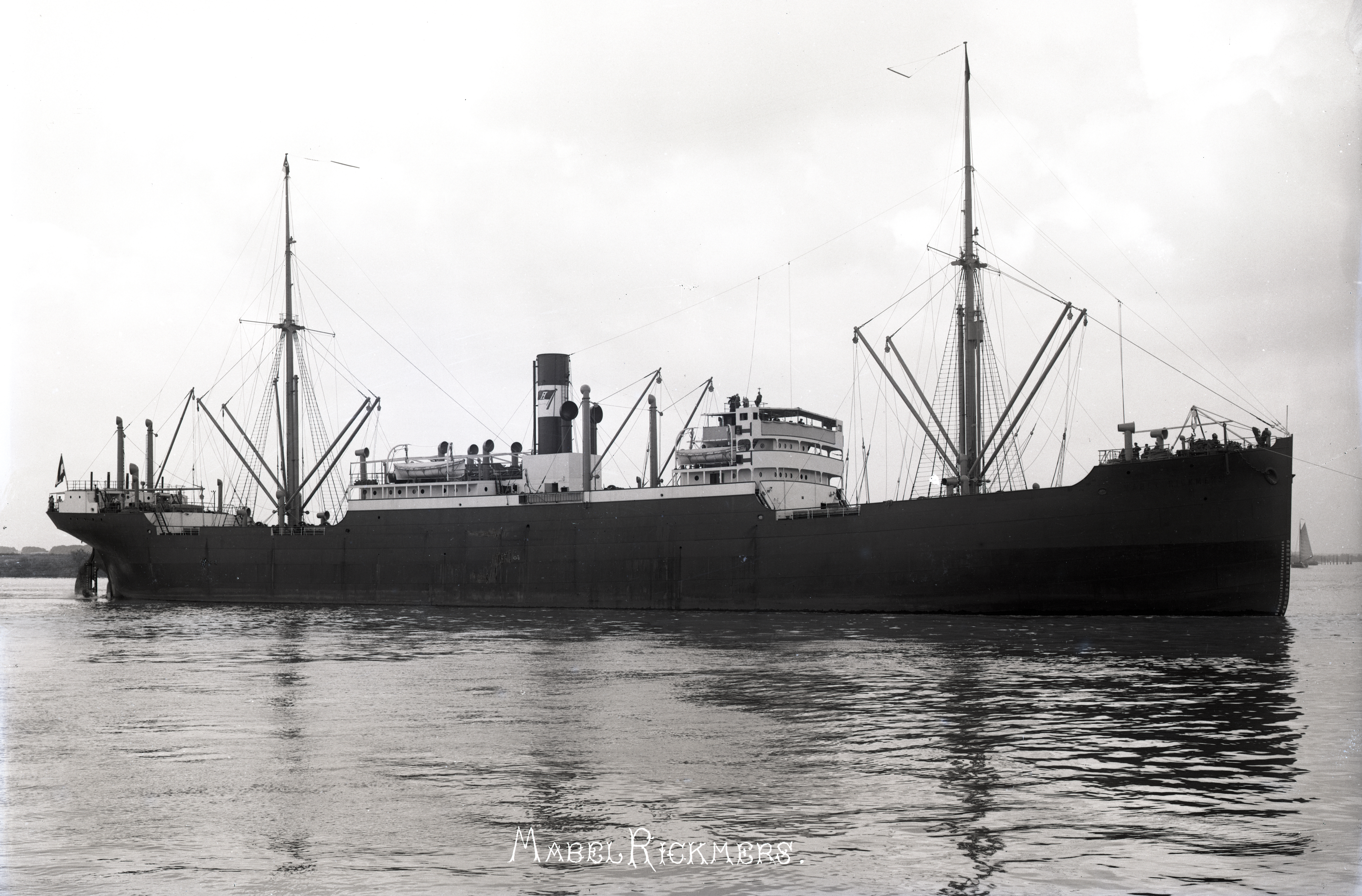
As Mabel Rickmers (1914-1917)

SS Tembien was an Italian steamship sunk during the Second World War. She had been built in Germany in 1914 and served under a number of names before joining the Italian company Ignazio Messina as Tembien. She was sunk on 27 February 1942 by the British submarine Upholder. She was carrying 468 Allied prisoners of war, a fact known to the British through Ultra decryptions. Her sinking caused the deaths of at least 390 prisoners and 78 crew and guards.

== Construction and operation ==
Tembien was a two-deck steel-built, oil-driven cargo vessel. She had a gross register tonnage of 5,584 and measured 417 feet (127 m) in length, 32 feet 2 inches (9.80 m) in width and 27 feet 5 inches (8.36 m) in depth. She was built by the Rickmers Group in Bremerhaven, Germany, in 1914. Her 500–nominal horsepower engines were made by AG Weser of Bremen. During her career she sailed under the names Mouni, Milluna, Nwc.No.3, Franziska, Mabel, Syd.No.2 and Mabel Rickmers. By the Second World War she was in service as Tembien for the Italian Ignazio Messina company and was based out of Genoa.

== Sinking ==
Tembien left Trapani, Italy, for Tripoli, Libya on 16 February 1942, escorted by the destroyer Saetta and arriving two days later. This journey went un-hindered by the Allies as Enigma decryptions (so-called Ultra intelligence) recorded only a convoy of unknown composition, and details of its position arrived too late for an attack to be made.

On 27 February 1942 Tembien, having left Tripoli, was sailing around 25 miles (40 km) to the west of the city, carrying 468 Allied prisoners of war from the North African campaign to Italy. Although the wounded were often transported in hospital ships, which granted protective status, the Axis often transported unwounded prisoners in unmarked cargo vessels which made them indistinguishable from legitimate targets.

Tembien was spotted by Lieutenant Commander David Wanklyn's submarine HMS Upholder. Two of Wanklyn's torpedoes struck the Tembien, causing her to sink and leading to the deaths of between 390 and 419 prisoners, 68 Italian crew members and 10 German guards. The route and manifest of the Tembien were known to the British through Ultra decryptions so it is not known why she was allowed to be attacked. One possibility is that to allow all prisoner-of-war ships safe passage on the basis of decrypted information would have alerted the Axis powers that the British had broken the Enigma codes. Sinkings of prisoner-of-war vessels decreased significantly later in 1942, suggesting a shift in policy.
