= Flank Battery Zoncia =

Flank Battery Zoncia is an Austro-Hungarian fortification located inside the inner perimeter of the Fortress of Pula. The battery was first built as an open-air battery with the guns in barbettes.

== History ==
The Zoncia Battery was built between 1823-30, and was a simple battery with the guns in open-air barbettes. Zoncia was armed with 4 47mm L/44 rapid-fire naval guns. The battery was part of the coastal defenses of Pula. It was built 11m above sea level to the north of the entrance to the harbor. During the first few years of being operational, Zoncia was garrisoned by army troops, until it was handed over to navy troops in 1841. The battery became famous for attacking and disabling the French Submarine Curie. The Zoncia Battery and Fort Punta Christo are the only fortifications of Pula to not be used during World War II. No traces of the battery remain today.
