= Empire Star (disambiguation) =

Empire Star is a 1966 novella by Samuel R. Delany.

Empire Star may also refer to:

- BSA Empire Star, a motorcycle built from 1936 to 1939
- SS Empire Star (1919), a Blue Star Line ship built as Empirestar and carrying this name from 1929–35
- MV Empire Star (1935), a Blue Star Line ship built in 1935 and sunk in 1942
- MV Empire Star (1946), a Blue Star Line ship in service 1946–50
