= SS Milazzo =

Italian Ship that sank in 1917

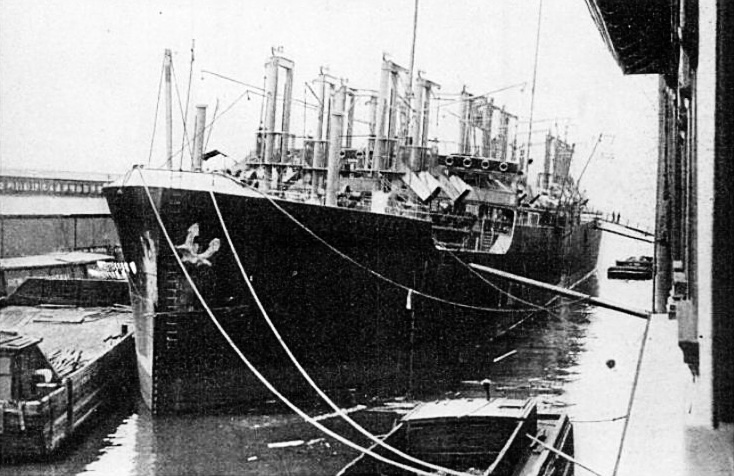
- SS Milazzo in port, 1916

History
- Name: Milazzo
- Namesake: Milazzo, Sicily
- Owner: Navigazione Generale Italiana
- Port of registry: (Italy) Genoa
- Builder: Fiat-San Giorgio, Muggiano
- Completed: June 1916
- Maiden voyage: Genoa – New York, 11 June – 1 July 1916
- Fate: Sunk on 29 August 1917
- Notes: sister ship of Volturno

General characteristics
- Type: bulk carrier
- Tonnage: 11,477 GRT
- Displacement: 20,400 long tons (20,700 t)
- Length: 157.7 m (517 ft 5 in) (pp)
- Beam: 20.1 m (65 ft 11 in)
- Draft: 6.2 m (20 ft 4 in)
- Depth of hold
- Propulsion: 1 x quadruple-expansion steam engine, 4,000 hp (3,000 kW)
- Speed: 11 knots (20 km/h)

SS Milazzo was an Italian bulk carrier built in 1916 and sunk during World War I. When she entered service, Milazzo was reported as the largest collier and also the largest cargo ship in the world. She was designed with a unique railcar and elevator system that helped to automate the discharge of cargo. SS Volturno was her sister ship.

Milazzo, built for and operated by Navigazione Generale Italiana, sailed to New York on her maiden voyage in June 1916. In October, on her second eastbound voyage, the ship put in at the Azores with three of her cargo holds ablaze; her New York agent attributed the fires to sabotage. On 29 August 1917, Milazzo was sunk by the Austro-Hungarian Navy submarine U-14 under the command of Georg Ritter von Trapp, later more notable as the patriarch of the family featured in The Sound of Music.

== Design and construction ==
Milazzo was designed by Emilio Menada, a noted inventor of transporting machinery. In a 1916 feature on the ship, Popular Science Monthly reported that there was "nothing romantic" about the "brutally practical" design of the ship, which the magazine called an "engine-driven hull and a mass of elevators and chutes". The ship was 157.7 meters (517 ft 5 in) long (between perpendiculars), was 20.1 meters (65 ft 11 in) abeam, and had a draft of 6.2 meters (20 ft 4 in) when loaded. Milazzo had a 11,477 gross register tons (GRT) and displaced 20,040 long tons (20,360 t). As designed, Milazzo could carry up to 14,000 long tons (14,200 t) of bulk coal or other cargo. Additional longitudinal compartments provided the ability to carry up to 4,500 long tons (4,600 t) of bulk oil.

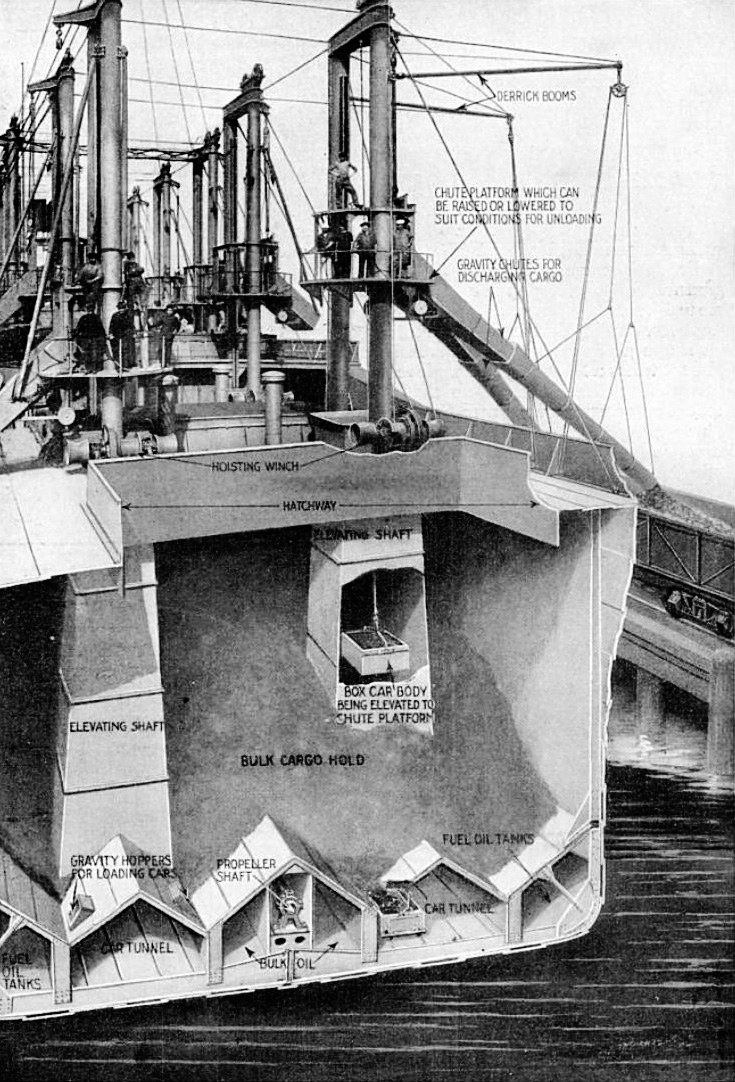
Cutaway illustration of Milazzo showing her cargo unloading systems.

Milazzo featured eight watertight bulkheads that divided her into nine separate compartments: eight 10.3-metre (33 ft 10 in) deep cargo holds and one compartment amidships for the ship's single quadruple-expansion steam engine. In addition, saltwater ballast tanks were located In the bow and the stern of Milazzo. The ship's engine generated 4,000 horsepower (3,000 kW) and moved the ship at an average speed of 11 knots (20 km/h). The ship's engine was originally installed on board passenger liner "Principessa Jolanda" which had capsized at launch in 1907 and had to be scrapped.

The cargo handling on Milazzo was intended to be automated and featured a railcar and elevator system. Two longitudinal compartments between the bottom of the cargo holds and the hull each contained twin rail lines spanning the length of the cargo carrying spaces. Extending from the bottom of the hull to above the ship's funnel were twenty elevator and crane combinations. To unload the ship, the onboard railcars were positioned under doors in each cargo hold which, filled the cars with the coal. The rail cars were then positioned in the elevators, raised to the top, and had their loads dumped into chutes that then discharged the coal from the ship. The ship could discharge all 14,000 long tons of her cargo in 48 hours.

Milazzo was built by the Fiat-San Giorgio shipyard in Muggiano and completed in June 1916.

== Service career ==
Milazzo departed from Genoa on her maiden voyage in early June. After calling at Naples, she departed there in ballast on 11 June for New York City. After losing a blade from her propeller in calm seas on 25 June—attributed by Milazzo's master to vibrations of the empty ship—she arrived at New York on 1 July.

After an uneventful roundtrip to Genoa, Milazzo departed from New York on 24 September to begin her second eastbound crossing of the Atlantic. At Gravesend Bay, Milazzo stopped and took on 100 long tons (102 t) of high explosives to supplement her 10,000-long-ton (10,200 t) cargo of steel, silk, and sugar. She also carried 1.6 million pounds (730,000 kg) of copper. On 4 October, The New York Times reported that Milazzo had put in at Fayal in the Azores with three cargo holds on fire. The newspaper printed speculation from William Hartfield, the agent for the ship, that incendiary bombs hidden in the bags of sugar were the cause of the fire. By 1 November (when she was reported as departing Tarzal), Milazzo had resumed service.

In August 1917, Milazzo was sailing from Karachi to Malta. On 29 August, when she was 250 nautical miles (460 km) east of her destination, she was torpedoed by the submarine U-14 of the Austro-Hungarian Navy and sank at 34°44′N 19°16′E. U-14 was under the command of Linienschiffsleutnant Georg Ritter von Trapp, a well-known submarine commander, later famous as the patriarch of the family featured in the musical The Sound of Music. Milazzo sank with no reported casualties, after a little more than one year of service.
