= SS Principessa Mafalda =

Italian ocean liner, sunk 1927, 314 dead

Coordinates: 16°56′S 37°46′W

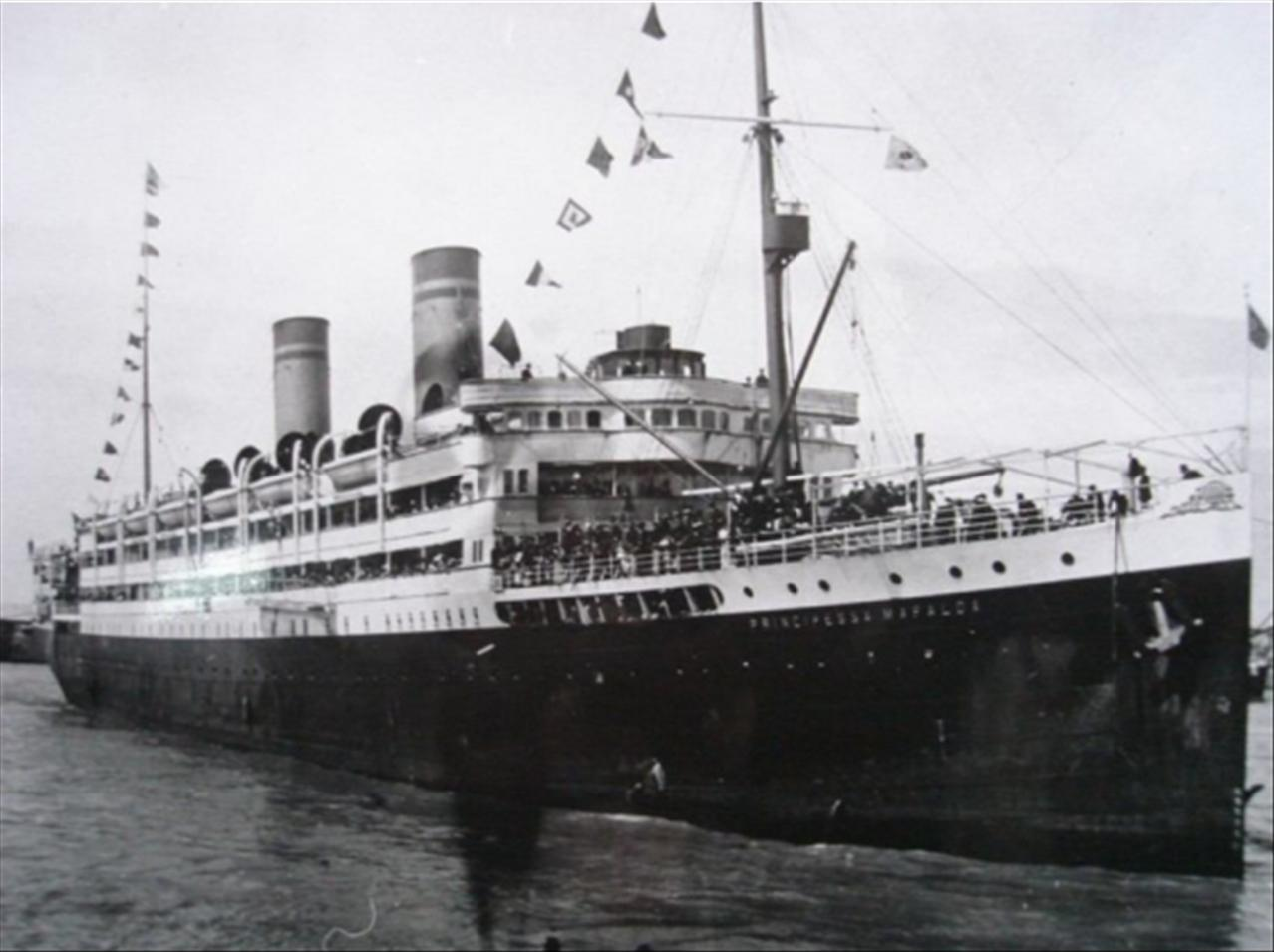
- Principessa Mafalda

History

Italy
- Name: Principessa Mafalda
- Namesake: Princess Mafalda of Savoy
- Owner: Navigazione Generale Italiana
- Port of registry: Genoa
- Route: Genoa–Buenos Aires
- Builder: Cantiere Navale di Riva Trigoso
- Launched: 22 October 1908
- Completed: 9 March 1909
- Fate: Sank on 25 October 1927 off the coast of Brazil

General characteristics
- Tonnage: 9,210 GRT
- Length: 463 ft (141 m)
- Beam: 56 ft (17 m)
- Propulsion: Two triple-expansion steam engines; twin screw propellers
- Speed: 18 knots (33 km/h; 21 mph)
- Capacity: 180 (first class); 150 (second class); 1,200 (third class)
- Notes: Two funnels, two masts

SS Principessa Mafalda was an Italian transatlantic ocean liner built for the Navigazione Generale Italiana (NGI) company. Named after Princess Mafalda of Savoy, second daughter of King Victor Emmanuel III, the ship was completed and entered NGI's South American service between Genoa and Buenos Aires in 1909. Her sister ship SS Principessa Jolanda sank immediately upon launching on 22 September 1907.

On 25 October 1927, while off the coast of Brazil, a propeller shaft fractured and damaged the hull. The ship sank slowly in the presence of rescue vessels, but confusion and panic resulted in 314 fatalities out of the 1,252 passengers and crew on board the ship. The sinking resulted in the greatest loss of life in Italian shipping, with the ship that was called "the Italian Titanic".

== Early history ==
Principessa Mafalda was built at Cantiere Navale di Riva Trigoso with her sister, Principessa Jolanda, which capsized and sank at her launch on 22 September 1907. Principessa Mafalda was launched on 22 October 1908 without her superstructure installed in order to avoid the same accident. She was finally completed on 30 March 1909 and became the flagship of the NGI. In 1910, she played a part in developing long-distance radio communication when Guglielmo Marconi conducted experiments on board.

Specifically designed for voyages between Genoa and Buenos Aires, Principessa Mafalda was considered the best ship on this route for several years, travelling at a relatively rapid 18 knots. Her amenities included a two-story ballroom and spacious cabins in Louis XVI style. On the eve of World War I, on 22 August 1914, she made her one and only voyage between Genoa and New York City. During the war, she was requisitioned by the Italian Royal Navy and housed officers at Taranto. She resumed her prewar South American service in 1918. She remained the NGI's flagship until 1922, when the SS Giulio Cesare assumed the role. By 1926 the Mafalda had made over 90 long but uneventful round trips.

On 10 January 1920, the ship was reported missing after hitting a mine with a full loss of life. Two days later, it sent a radio signal that it was safe and was proceeding as normal.

== Last voyage and sinking ==
Approximate location of the sinking

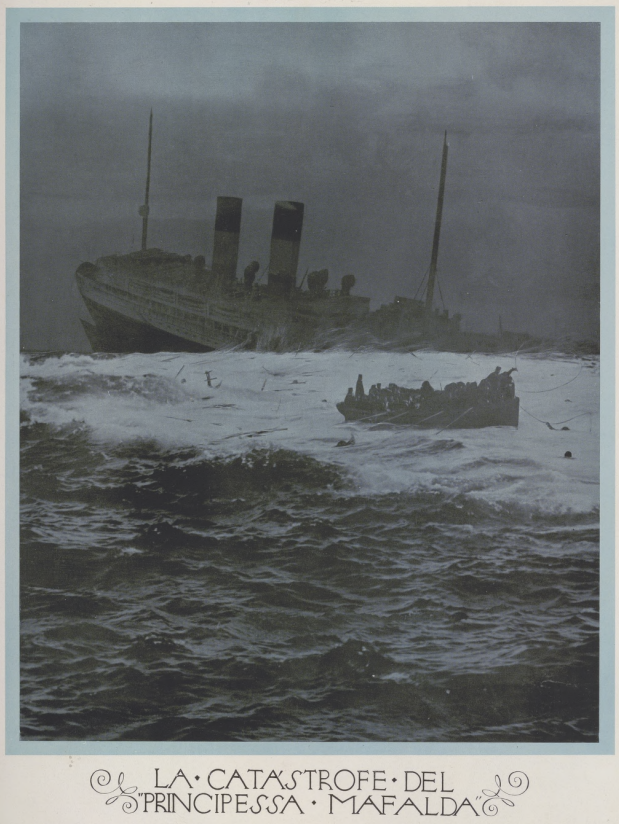
The Principessa Mafalda catastrophe. Argentine magazine Plus Ultra, November 1927.

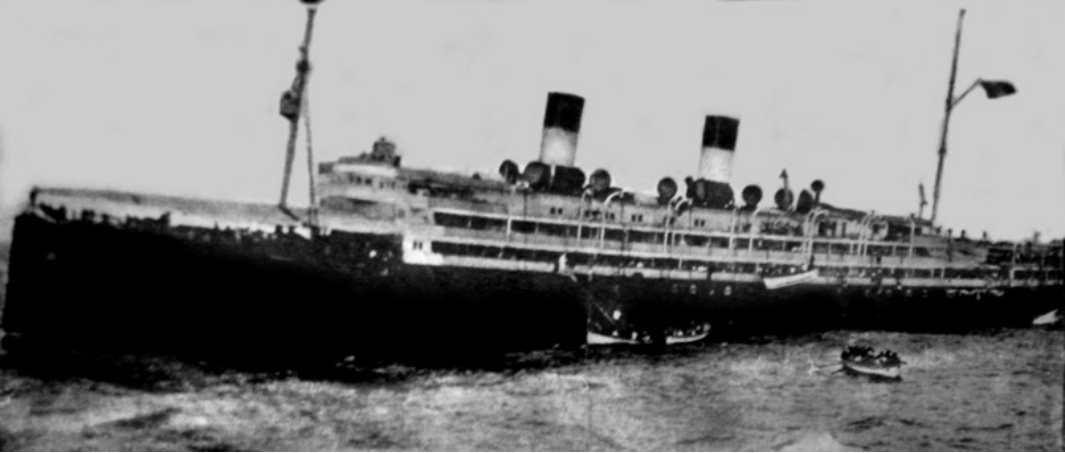
Principessa Mafalda sinking

On 11 October 1927, Principessa Mafalda sailed from Genoa for Buenos Aires with intermediate stops scheduled at Barcelona, Dakar, Rio de Janeiro, Santos, and Montevideo. The ship was under the command of Captain Simone Gulì, with 971 passengers and 288 crew aboard. She also carried 300 tonnes of cargo, 600 bags of mail, and 250,000 gold lire destined for the Argentine government. The trip was to take 14 days.

It soon became apparent that the ship was in poor condition. Principessa Mafalda left Barcelona almost a day late due to mechanical problems, and several times, she slowed to a complete stop on the high seas, sometimes for hours. Water in bathrooms became intermittent. A refrigeration system failure caused tons of food to spoil, resulting in numerous cases of food poisoning. At the stop at Cape Verde, Captain Gulì telegraphed the company to request a replacement vessel but was told, "Continue to Rio and await instructions." With the ship resupplied with fresh food and partially repaired, he took her out onto the Atlantic.

By 23 October, Principessa Mafalda had developed a small but noticeable list to port. The passengers, who had received few explanations for the previous breakdowns, now began to worry that the ship was taking on water. Although far behind schedule, she was finally travelling at full steam off the coast of northern Brazil on the 24th. Life aboard flowed more quietly, with the longest part of the journey nearly complete. On crossing the Equator, a line-crossing ceremony was organized on deck with orchestra music and a huge cake.

Around 17:15 hours on 25 October 1927, near the Abrolhos Archipelago, 130 kilometres (80 mi) off Salvador de Bahia, Brazil, the ship was rocked by several strong shudders. Passengers were initially assured that this was only due to the loss of a propeller and the situation was not dangerous. However, on the bridge, the engineer reported that the starboard propeller shaft had indeed fractured, but it had also travelled off its axis and cut a series of gashes in the hull. Complicating matters, the watertight doors could not be fully closed. At 17:35, Captain Gulì sounded the alarm and ordered the radio officer to send SOS. He also stated this was merely a precaution as he believed his ship could stay afloat until the next day. Two ships, the Empire Star (British) and Alhena (Dutch), arrived quickly. With clear weather and rescue nearby, the situation seemed to be under control.

There are many conflicting versions of what happened next. According to some sources, the ship kept moving forward in a wide circle for at least an hour; rescue vessels received confusing signals about how to assist, and not all the lifeboats could be launched due to the list, with some being rushed by the crowd and several proving to be unseaworthy due to a lack of maintenance. The rescue vessels, fearing a possible boiler explosion, kept themselves at a distance. However, several of their lifeboats were able to come alongside the sinking ship and shuttle survivors between her and the rescue ships, especially the Alhena. Captain Gulì directed the launching of the lifeboats from the bridge with his megaphone; the evacuation was orderly at first, but panic began to quickly spread when power failed at 22:03, plunging the vessel into darkness. Passengers started jumping into the sea, where sharks attacked some, and Gulì, realizing that the ship was now sinking fast, ordered all the remaining lifeboats to be lowered; the considerable list to port hampered the launching of the starboard lifeboats, several of which were damaged against the hull and rendered unusable. The situation was somewhat better on the port side, under the charge of first officer Maresco. Still, several lifeboats started taking on water due to their deteriorated condition, and the panicked passengers capsized others. Some passengers reportedly committed suicide; accounts told that several first-class passengers stayed with the captain and did not bother to reach the lifeboats.

Captain Gulì went down with the ship, and the chief engineer, Silvio Scarabicchi, reportedly committed suicide by shooting himself. Gulì was posthumously decorated for bravery at sea, as were the two radio operators, Luigi Reschia and Francesco Boldracchi, who had remained at their posts until they drowned.

At 22:10, about four hours and twenty minutes after the initial accident, Principessa Mafalda sank stern first. Several vessels arrived to assist since she went down on a busy shipping lane. By daybreak, Alhena had picked up 450 survivors. Avelona rescued 300, Empire Star rescued 202, Formosa 151. Rosetti rescued 122. Moselle rescued 49 people, 22 of whom were landed at Bahia. Those rescued by Empire Star were transferred to Formosa and landed at Rio de Janeiro. Many controversies remain about exactly what transpired and who was responsible for the death toll. Reports of gunfire, sharks in the water, exploding boilers, and nearby ships refusing to assist were widely published but never confirmed. Even the exact wreck site remains a matter of dispute today. At the time, the sinking was the largest loss of life on an Italian ship and in the Southern Hemisphere.

== Aftermath ==
An investigation by the Italian Navy Board began immediately following the tragedy. It determined that a joint in the propeller casing was to blame for the accident. It ordered propeller shafts on all Italian-registered vessels to be fitted with devices designed to avoid such accidents. It also determined that six lifeboats on the stern could not be used because of poor placement. Issues of the vessel's age, inadequate maintenance, and the crew's actions were not investigated. However, the NGI was ordered to compensate the victims' families heavily.

A 2012 analysis discovered that while the number of casualties among steerage passengers was indeed high, a greater proportion of first-class passengers died (51.8%) than of steerage-class passengers (27.8%). The survival rate of men (74.1%) and women (73.3%) was almost identical.

== Sources ==
- Gumbrecht, Hans (1997). In 1926: Living at the Edge of Time. Harvard University Press. ISBN 0-674-00055-2.
- Goldstein, Richard (2001). Desperate Hours: The Epic Rescue of the Andrea Doria. Wiley & Sons. ISBN 978-047138934-7.
