= HMS Durban =

Cruiser of the Royal Navy

Coordinates: 49°20′44″N 00°16′08″W

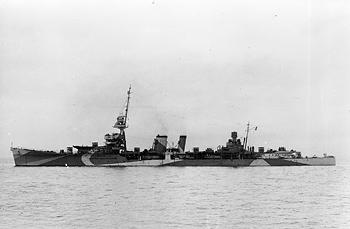

History

United Kingdom
- Name: HMS Durban
- Ordered: September 1917
- Builder: Scotts Shipbuilding and Engineering Company, Greenock; Completed by Devonport Dockyard
- Laid down: January 1918
- Launched: 29 May 1919
- Commissioned: 1 November 1921
- Identification: Pennant number: 99 (Aug 21); I.99 (1936); D.99 (1940)
- Fate: Sunk as breakwater, 9 June 1944

General characteristics
- Class & type: Danae-class light cruiser
- Displacement: 4,650 tons
- Length: 472.5 ft (144.0 m)
- Beam: 46.5 ft (14.2 m)
- Draught: 14.5 ft (4.4 m)
- Propulsion: Six Yarrow-type water-tube boilers; Parsons geared steam turbines; Two shafts; 40,000 shp (30,000 kW)
- Speed: 29 knots (54 km/h; 33 mph)
- Range: 2,300 nautical miles (4,300 km; 2,600 mi)
- Complement: 350
- Armament: 1918: six BL 6-inch (152.4 mm) L/45 Mark XII guns on single mountings CP Mark XIV; two QF 3-inch (76.2 mm) Mk II AA guns; two QF 2-pounder (40-mm) "Pom-pom" AA guns; twelve 21-inch (533 mm) torpedo tubes (4 triple launchers)
- Armour: 3-inch side (amidships); 2, 1¾, 1½ side (bow and stern); 1 inch upper decks (amidships); 1 inch deck over rudder

HMS Durban was a Danae-class light cruiser of the Royal Navy. She was launched from the yards of Scotts Shipbuilding and Engineering Company on 29 May 1919 and commissioned on 1 November 1921.

== Early career ==
Durban was initially assigned to the China Station as part of the 5th Light Cruiser Squadron in January 1922, and in 1928 she was transferred to the America and West Indies Station based at the Royal Naval Dockyard at Bermuda, with Prince George, Duke of Kent, the fourth son of King George V and Queen Mary, serving aboard as a watch-keeping Lieutenant. In 1930 Durban returned to Britain, and in 1931 she joined the South Atlantic Division. By December 1933, she was relieved by the heavy cruiser York and again returned to home waters. In March 1934, Durban left for Gibraltar to join the Mediterranean Fleet. She spent two years on this station, returning to Britain in September 1936 to be placed into reserve.

== Wartime service ==
On the outbreak of the Second World War in September 1939, Durban was recommissioned and assigned to the 9th Cruiser Squadron under the Commander-in-Chief, South Atlantic. In March 1940 she was operating in the Indian Ocean and was then transferred to the Eastern Fleet based at Singapore. Here she became a unit of the British Malaysian Force with her two sister ships, Danae and Dauntless. The unit kept watch on German merchant ships in the Dutch East Indies harbours, with Durban's patrol area being off Padang. On 10 November 1940 the Norwegian tanker Ole Jacob reported being attacked by the German raider Atlantis between Ceylon, and the north end of Sumatra. A force was hastily assembled, comprising Durban, the cruiser Capetown and the Australian cruiser Canberra and armed merchant cruiser Westralia to hunt for Atlantis. The task force was however unable to locate the raider.

In 1941 Durban, with her sister Dragon, was escorting convoys between Singapore and the Sunda Strait. In February, she escorted the ocean liner Queen Mary, then carrying Second Australian Imperial Force troops for Malaya, into Singapore, arriving on 18 February. In November, she escorted the troopship Zealandia into Singapore, after relieving the Australian cruiser Sydney which had escorted Zealandia from Fremantle, Western Australia.

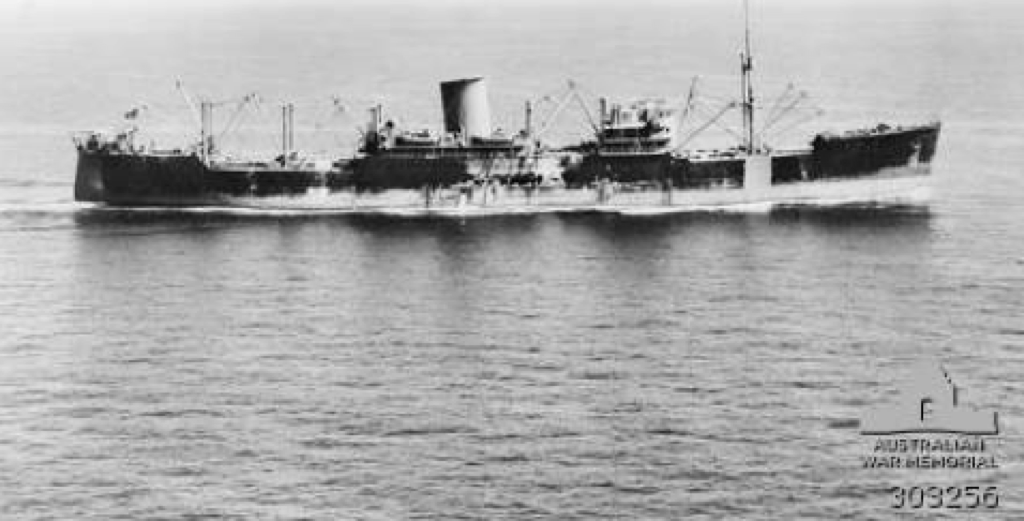
Empire Star, which Durban escorted to Tandjong Priok in the evacuation of Singapore

In February 1942 Durban moved with the rest of the Eastern Fleet to Java, after the Japanese started their attack on Singapore. Durban was damaged by bombing before she could leave, but on 12 February she and the anti-submarine vessel Kedah escorted the merchant ships Empire Star and Gorgon out of Singapore, repelling successive Japanese air attacks for four hours. The next day the convoy, carrying thousands of evacuees from Singapore, reached Tandjong Priok, the port for Batavia. Durban, with Admiral Thomas C. Hart as a passenger, departed 16 February escorting Plancius carrying refugees to Colombo. There Durban underwent temporary repairs. She then travelled to New York, arriving in April, where full repairs were completed. Durban then returned to Britain, where further modifications were made in Portsmouth between June and August. She then escorted convoys from Britain to South Africa.

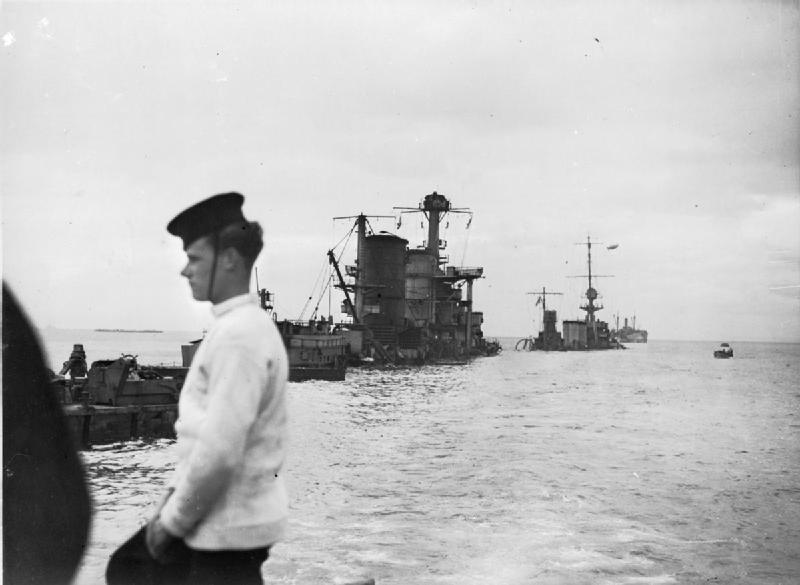
HMS Durban and HNLMS Sumatra (foreground) half-sunk amid a line of block ships, 9 June 1944

On 8 December 1942 the ship grounded in the entrance to Mombasa harbour. After refloating she was drydocked in Bombay. In February 1943 Durban was again in New York for repairs, and by June had returned to South Africa, docking at Simonstown, before rejoining the Eastern Fleet. In November, she once again returned to Britain to be paid off into the reserve. She was then one of the ships selected to be scuttled to form a breakwater for the Mulberry harbours that would be used to support the Battle of Normandy.

Subsequently, on 9 June 1944 Durban was scuttled to form part of the Gooseberry 5 breakwater for protecting the artificial harbour off Ouistreham in the Seine Bay. The wreck currently lies in 11 metres (36 ft) of water.
