= Margaret Irene Anderson =

Australian Army nurse (1915–1995)

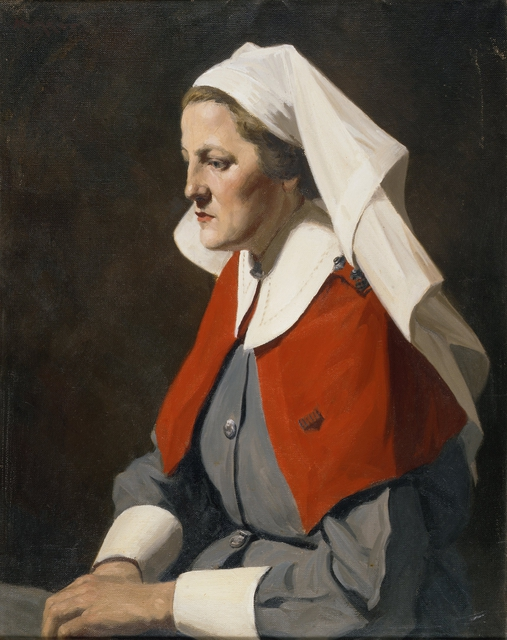
- Born: 11 December 1915; Malvern, Victoria
- Died: 16 July 1995 (aged 79); Frankston, Victoria
- Military career
- Allegiance: Australia
- Branch: Australian Army
- Service years: 1940–1946
- Rank: Lieutenant
- Service number: VFX63845
- Unit: Australian Army Nursing Service
- Conflicts: Second World War; Fall of Singapore
- Awards: George Medal

Margaret Irene O'Bryan, GM (née Anderson; 11 December 1915 – 16 July 1995) was an Australian Army nurse. Anderson was awarded a George Medal for her heroism while caring for the wounded at sea after the invasion of Singapore in 1942. Lieutenant Anderson continued to serve on hospital ships until 1945.

== Early life ==
Anderson was born on 11 December 1915 in the Melbourne suburb of Malvern. Her parents were Jessie Blanchrie (née Urquhart) and Charles Anderson. Her father was employed as a driver. Anderson qualified as a nurse in 1940 at the Austin Hospital in Melbourne's suburb of Heidelberg and in the same year she became a staff nurse in the Australian Army Nursing Service.

== Nursing career ==
In 1941 Anderson was aboard the SS Zealandia, which had left Melbourne on 2 November and then arrived in Singapore on 20 November. The ship was escorted by HMAS Sydney, which was on one of its last trips. She and Vera Torey, who she had trained with in Heidelberg, were assigned to the 13th General Hospital which was itself moving from Singapore to Tampoi. Their eight-storey building was inappropriate, but during that November, 100 tons of equipment was moved to Tampoi. She and Torey would have been on night duty on 2 December 1941 when they heard what was assumed to be their air force practising night bombing. They were not aware that Japan had joined the war, but very soon the casualties arrived. By 16 January casualties arrived around the clock and all the nurses worked long hours. They heard on the radio that Japanese forces planned to use their building on 26 January.

On 8 February the Japanese invasion of Singapore began. In the harbour Empire Star had loaded equipment and stores and over 2,000 people. These people were British and Australian military and 133 army nurses, including Anderson. The nurses were members of the Australian Army Nursing Service from two Australian Army Medical Corps hospitals. The ship had set sail with would-be passengers held back at gun point. In fact 139 Australian servicemen were later arrested for travelling without authorisation.

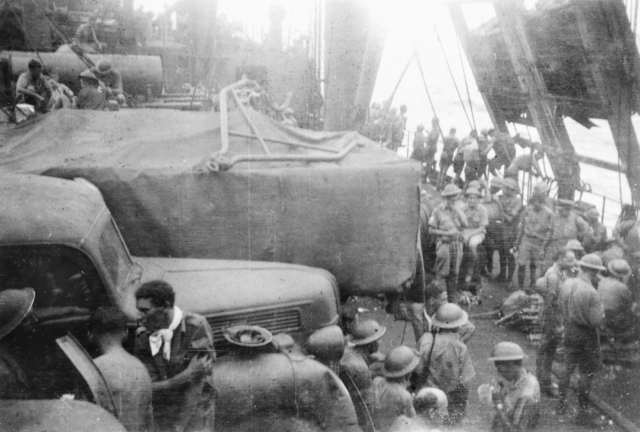
Evacuated troops and RAF equipment from Singapore aboard Empire Star, 12 February 1942

On 12 February, six Japanese dive-bombers attacked the ship and its convoy. Anti-aircraft fire shot down one aircraft and damaged another, which broke off from the attack. The Empire Star was set afire in three places and several people on board were killed. Anderson was among the Australian nurses who tended the wounded below decks. When they thought the attack was over they brought their patients into the fresh air. As aircraft again machine-gunned the ship, Anderson and Veronica ("Vera") Torney threw themselves upon wounded soldiers to protect them from further injury, while the ship took "violent evasive action".

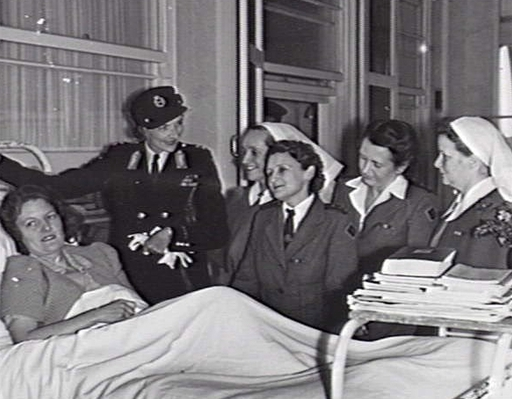
Anderson with Lady Mountbatten, Matron Ethel Bowe, and Sisters Wilkinson, James and Syes at Heidelberg in 1945

In September 1942 numerous members of the ship's company were decorated for their part in the operation. Anderson was awarded the George Medal, and Torney was appointed a Member of the Order of the British Empire. Anderson then returned to nursing in Australia where she had been promoted to sister. In January 1943 she joined the hospital ship MS Wanganella. During 1943 she, like other Australian nurses, was given a military rank and she became Lieutenant Anderson. She was with the Wanganella as it travelled to Italy, New Guinea and hospitals in Australia until August 1945.

After the war Anderson worked as a clerk in Malvern and married Allen Ronald O'Bryan in 1956. She died on 16 July 1995 at Frankston.

== Sources ==
- "Taffrail" (Henry Taprell Dorling) (1973). Blue Star Line at War, 1939–45. London: W. Foulsham & Co. pp. 61–64, 109–113. ISBN 0-572-00849-X.
