= SS Principessa Jolanda (1907) =

Italian transatlantic ocean liner

Coordinates: 44°15′16.91″N 9°25′38.87″E

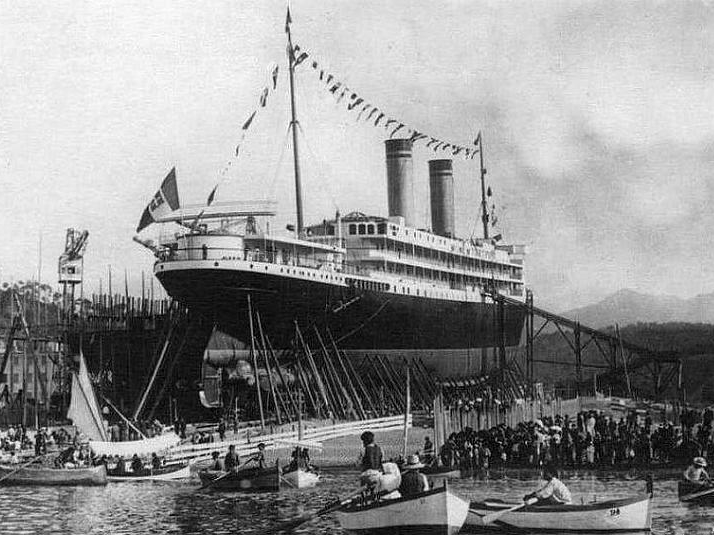
- Principessa Jolanda just prior to launch, 22 September 1907

History

Italy
- Name: Principessa Jolanda
- Namesake: Princess Yolanda of Savoy
- Owner: Navigazione Generale Italiana
- Port of registry: Genoa
- Route: Genoa–South America
- Builder: Cantiere Navale di Riva Trigoso
- Launched: 22 September 1907
- Fate: Capsized during launch, scrapped on site

General characteristics
- Tonnage: 9,210 GRT
- Length: 463 ft (141 m)
- Beam: 56 ft (17 m)
- Propulsion: two triple-expansion steam engines; twin screw propellers; 10,500 hp
- Speed: 18 knots (33 km/h)
- Capacity: 1,550
- Notes: two funnels, two masts

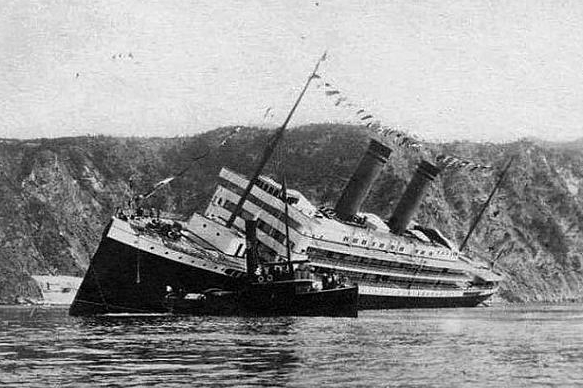
Principessa Jolanda listing heavily shortly after launch.

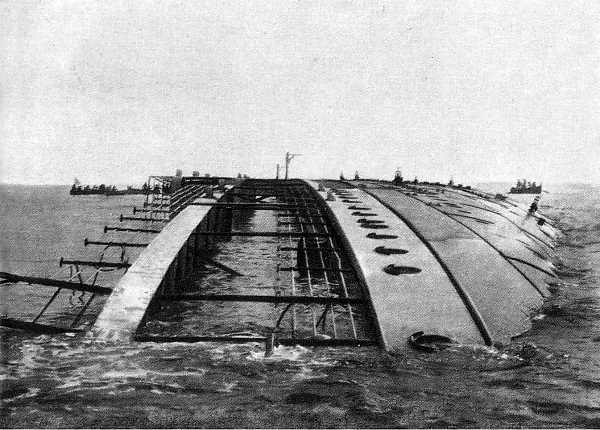
Final position of the ship.

The SS Principessa Jolanda was an Italian transatlantic ocean liner that capsized during her launch in 1907.

Built by Cantiere Navale di Riva Trigoso for the Navigazione Generale Italiana (NGI) shipping company and named after Princess Yolanda of Savoy, the eldest daughter of King Victor Emmanuel III, the ship was intended for the NGI's South American service. At 9,210 tons and 141 m (463 ft) in length, she was the largest passenger ship built in Italy up to that time. Constructed at a cost of 6 million lire to designs by Erasmo Piaggio, the Principessa Jolanda has also been called the first true Italian luxury liner. She was among the first transatlantic vessels fitted with Marconi Wireless telegraphy, electric lighting throughout and telephones in each cabin.

At 12:25 pm on 22 September 1907 the nearly completed Principessa Jolanda was launched before a large audience of onlookers, government officials and foreign journalists. After travelling down the slipway, the ship immediately became unstable and heeled sharply to port. Efforts by tugboats and shipyard workers to rescue the situation, including lowering the anchors to starboard to counteract the movement, were unsuccessful. After 20 minutes the vessel's list was such that it began taking on water through openings in the upper decks. She soon capsized with her funnels a few metres above and parallel to the water. Within an hour she finally slid lower until only a few feet of the side were visible. The captain, his guests and the workers onboard had just enough time to escape in the lifeboats. There were no casualties.

Although brand new, she was deemed unsalvageable and the wreck was broken up on site. The engines were salvaged and used in another vessel, now believed to be the SS Milazzo.

== Causes of the sinking ==
Shipyard technicians concluded that launching the Jolanda with all her fittings and furnishings already installed but without any coal or ballast resulted in the center of gravity being too high. Once the ship began heeling, a large amount of movable material increased the list, an example of the free surface effect involving solid objects as opposed to the more common liquids. Water entered through portholes and other openings in the superstructure as the ship heeled over. These and other errors, such as launching the ship too rapidly, caused the fatal instability that led to disaster.

It was further theorized that the abrupt change in transverse rotational axis during the ship's descent down the long launch ramp caused the bow to press against the chute itself as the stern hit the water. This may have caused a crack somewhere in the keel, contributing to admission of water to the hull. Regardless of the exact cause, it was eventually determined that full responsibility for the loss of the steamship was due to the shipyard's technical mistakes during launch and not in the design or construction of the vessel.

== Sister ship ==
At the time of SS Principessa Jolanda's launch construction on her sister ship, SS Principessa Mafalda, was well advanced with most of the framework completed. The Mafalda was launched in 1908 with much of her superstructure uninstalled in order to prevent the same disaster. The launch was successful and Mafalda was fully completed in March 1909. She became the flagship of the NGI and also served as an officers billet during World War I. In 1927 Mafalda sank in a separate disaster.
