= SS Duilio =

Italian ocean liner (1916–1944)

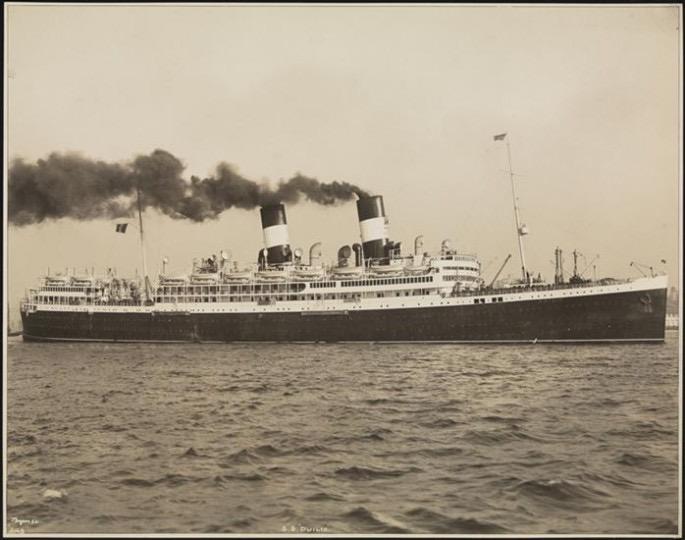
- SS Duilio

History

Italy
- Name: SS Duilio
- Operator: 1923-1932: Navigazione Generale Italiana; 1932-1936: Italian Line; 1936-1942: Lloyd Triestino; 1942-1944: International Red Cross
- Port of registry: Italy
- Route: Genoa-Buenos Aires
- Launched: 9 January 1916
- Completed: October 1923
- In service: 1923
- Out of service: 1943
- Fate: Sunk by Allied aircraft 10 July 1944

General characteristics
- Tonnage: 24,881 GRT
- Length: 193,75 m
- Beam: 23,20 m
- Propulsion: 4 groups of coal fired boilers (later adapted to naphtha), 4 propellers, power: 24.000 cv/axis
- Speed: 19.50 knots
- Capacity: 1,300 passengers

SS Duilio was an Italian ocean liner and one of the largest Italian merchant ships until 1925. She measured 24,281 gross register tons and was the sister of the SS Giulio Cesare, which was launched in 1921. She was constructed for the Italian shipping company “Navigazione Generale Italiana” based in Genoa and constructed by Ansaldo Shipyard owned by Sestri Ponente. She was sunk on 10 July 1944.

== History ==
=== Passenger service ===
SS Duilio was laid down in 1914 and launched on 9 January 1916 in the Ansaldo Yard but was not completed until 1923. She made her maiden voyage on 29 October 1923 from Naples to New York City. Her safety standards exceeded the norms of the time. For example, she had 16 watertight bulkheads subdividing her hull into 17 compartments although only 12 were required by the First International Convention for the Safety of Life at Sea. This would enable her to still float with 4 flooded compartments. One of the first Italian steamships, the Duilio had a complete system of anti-roll cases.

The ship was constructed with coal-fired steam engines for the Naples–New York City route, but was later transferred to the Genoa–Buenos Aires route on 24 July 1928. She was adapted for Naphtha combustion at Pristava and subsequently served on the new Italian Line to South Africa alongside the SS Giulio Cesare. She was chartered to Lloyd Triestino in 1933 and then transferred to Lloyd Triestino in 1936.

=== Second World War ===
She was laid up in 1940. In 1942, during the Second World War, SS Duilio was briefly chartered to the International Red Cross, before being laid up at the port of Trieste in 1943, again alongside SS Giulio Cesare. Duilio and Giulio Cesare were sunk there on 10 July 1944, in an attack by Allied aircraft. Her wreckage was salvaged and scrapped in 1948.

== Sources ==
- Ansaldo, ANSALDO SHIPS, Publishing Edindustria, Rome 1960
