= Navigazione Generale Italiana =

Italian shipping company

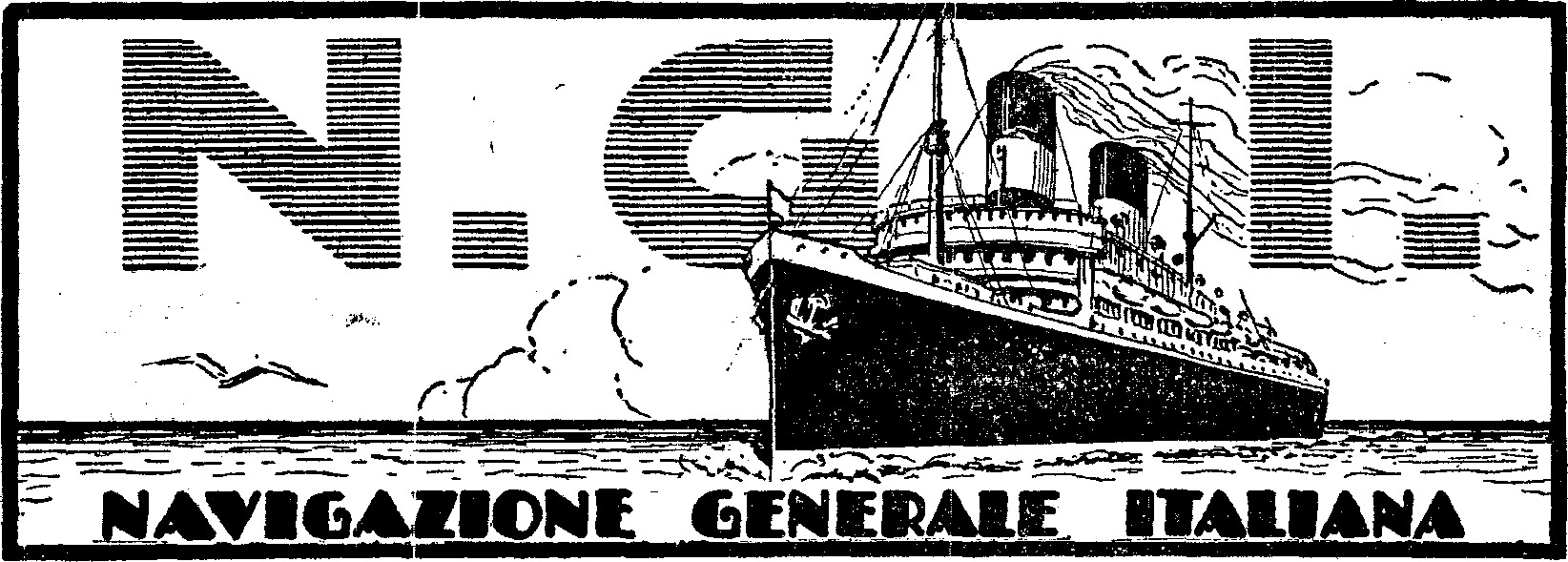
- Industry: Shipping, transportation
- Predecessor: I & V. Florio and Raffaele Rubattino
- Founded: 1881; 145 years ago
- Area served: North and South Atlantic

Navigazione Generale Italiana (NGI) was an Italian shipping company.

== History ==
The company formed in 1881 by the merger of I & V. Florio of Palermo and Raffaele Rubattino of Genoa. At the time of the merger, the two companies both operated extensively in the Mediterranean, with I & V Florio also operating routes to the United States and Canada, and Raffele Rubattino operating routes to India and the Far East through the Suez Canal.

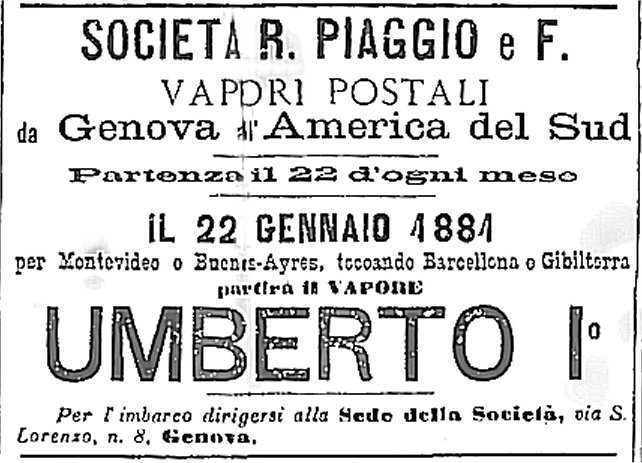
inserzione su Gazzetta provinciale di Bergamo del 3.1.1881

The Florio Line brought 50 ships into the merger, while Rubattino contributed 40. Following the merger, the new company not only maintained the existing service, it expanded by adding service to South America in 1884. To support the new routes, in 1885, NGI acquired competitors Società Italiana Trasporti Marittimi Raggio & Co. and Società Rocco Piaggio & Figli.

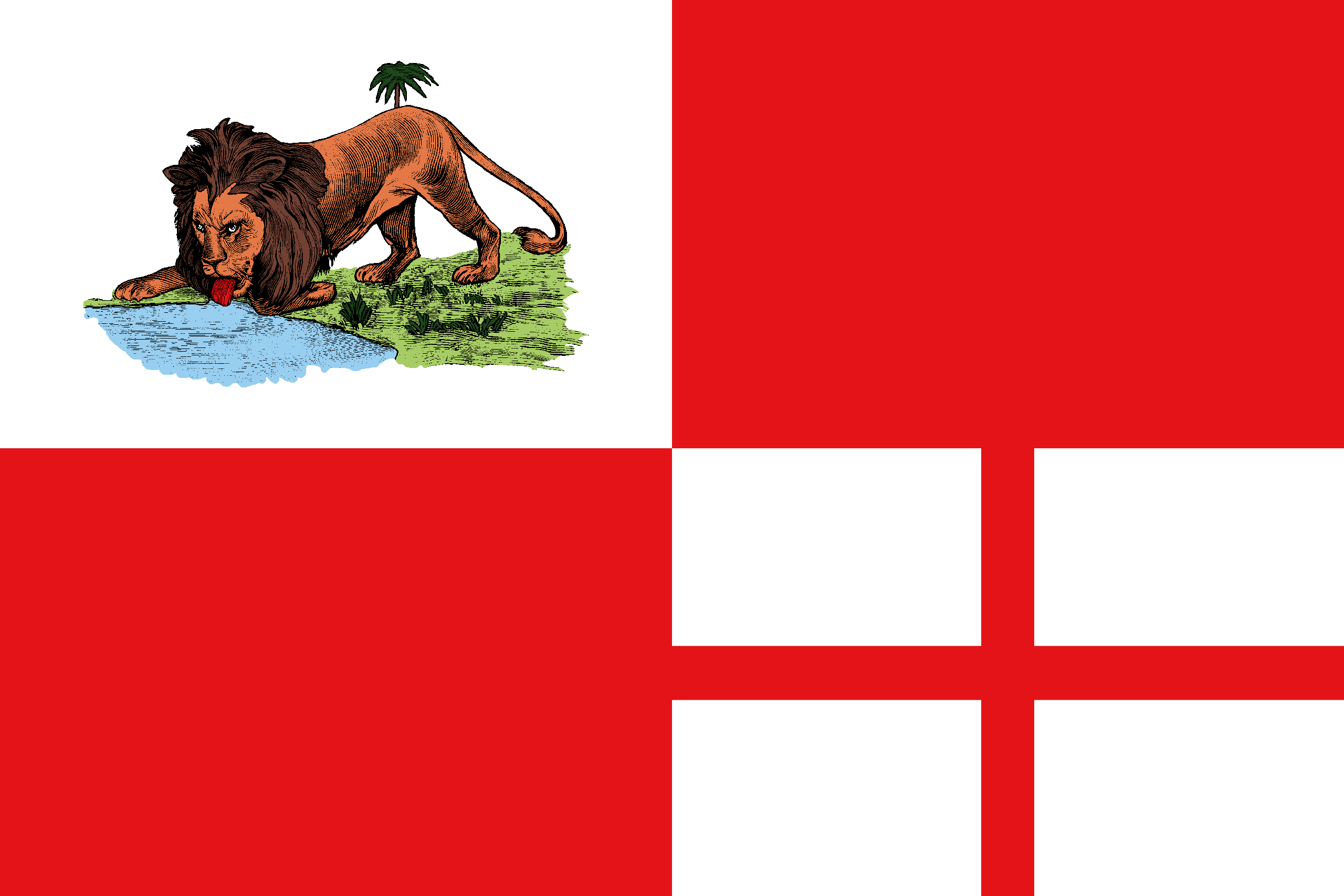
House flag, the drinking lion located in the canton is a symbol used by the Florio family's companies.

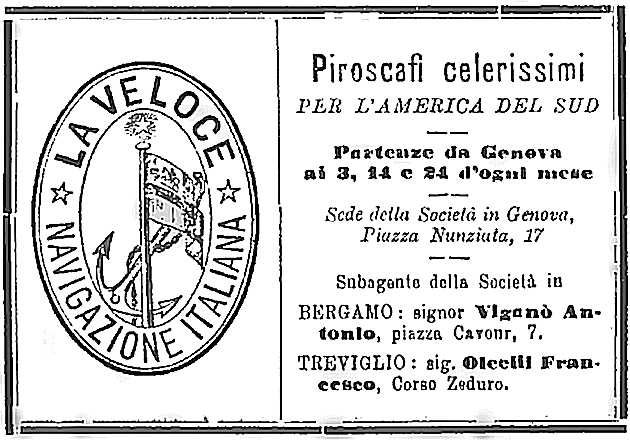
"La Veloce" inserzione su Gazzetta provinciale di Bergamo del 23.1.1890

Società Italiana di Transporti Marittimi Raggio & Co. was founded in Genoa in 1882 by Carlo, Edilio and Armando Raggio to transport passengers and freight between Italy and South America; Società Rocco Piaggio & Figli was formed in Genoa in 1870 and operated routes to Montevideo and Buenos Aires through the Canary Islands, then later between Genoa, Naples, and Rio de la Plata.

In 1901, the company further expanded by acquiring the assets of La Veloce, a shipping company formed in 1884 which was liquidated in 1924 following its acquisition by Navigazione Generale Italiana.

1906 brought another expansion with the acquisition of Italia Società di Navigazione a Vapore, a shipping company founded in Genoa in 1899.

On June 13, 1910, the Società Nazionale dei Servizi Marittimi acquired the NGI's Mediterranean routes allowing NGI to focus on the trans-Atlantic operations with 19 remaining vessels. Also in 1910, NGI acquired Lloyd Italiano, a shipping company started in Genoa in 1904 by Erasmo Piaggio who was pursuing links with North and South America.

In 1932, NGI merged with Lloyd Sabaudo and Cosulich Line to form the Italian Line that later built the one-time Italian Blue Riband champion SS Rex and the ill-fated SS Andrea Doria.

== Routes ==
The company's principal routes were those from Italy-US East Coast and Italy-Brazil/Argentina, both strongly underpinned economically by the emigrant trade.

== Fleet ==
Over the decades of its existence the company had quite an extensive fleet. Amongst these were a group of ships named after the Italian royal family and other aristocrats and figures of Roman history. Amongst the largest of these was the MS Augustus (1926) 1927-46 and its sister ship the SS Roma, others included the SS Giulio Cesare 1922-44 and the SS Duilio 1923–43.

== Ships of the Navigazione Generale Italiana ==
Name	Shipyard	GRT	Length [m]	Passengers	Launch/ Enter Service	Notes
SS Principessa Mafalda	Cantiere Navale di Riva Trigoso -	9210	141	1530	22 October 1908; 9 March 1909	Sank off the coast of Brazil on 25 October 1927 with loss of over 300 lives
Principessa Jolanda	Cantiere Navale di Riva Trigoso -	9210	141	1550	22 September 1907	Capsized at launch. Scrapped at site.
Principe Umberto	Cantieri Navali del Tirreno Palermo; No. 13	7838	145.1	-	April 1909	Troop transport during WW1, sunk by U-5, 8 June 1916 in the Adriatic with between 1,750 and 1,926 men lost.

== Pictures ==
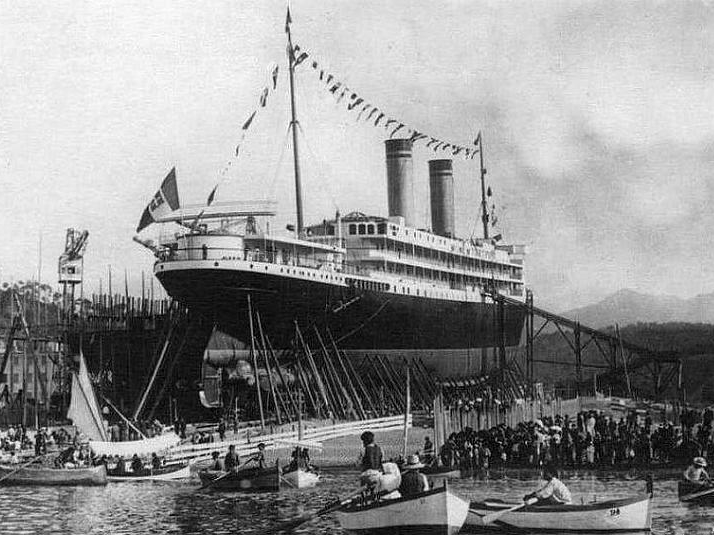
Launch of Principessa Jolanda

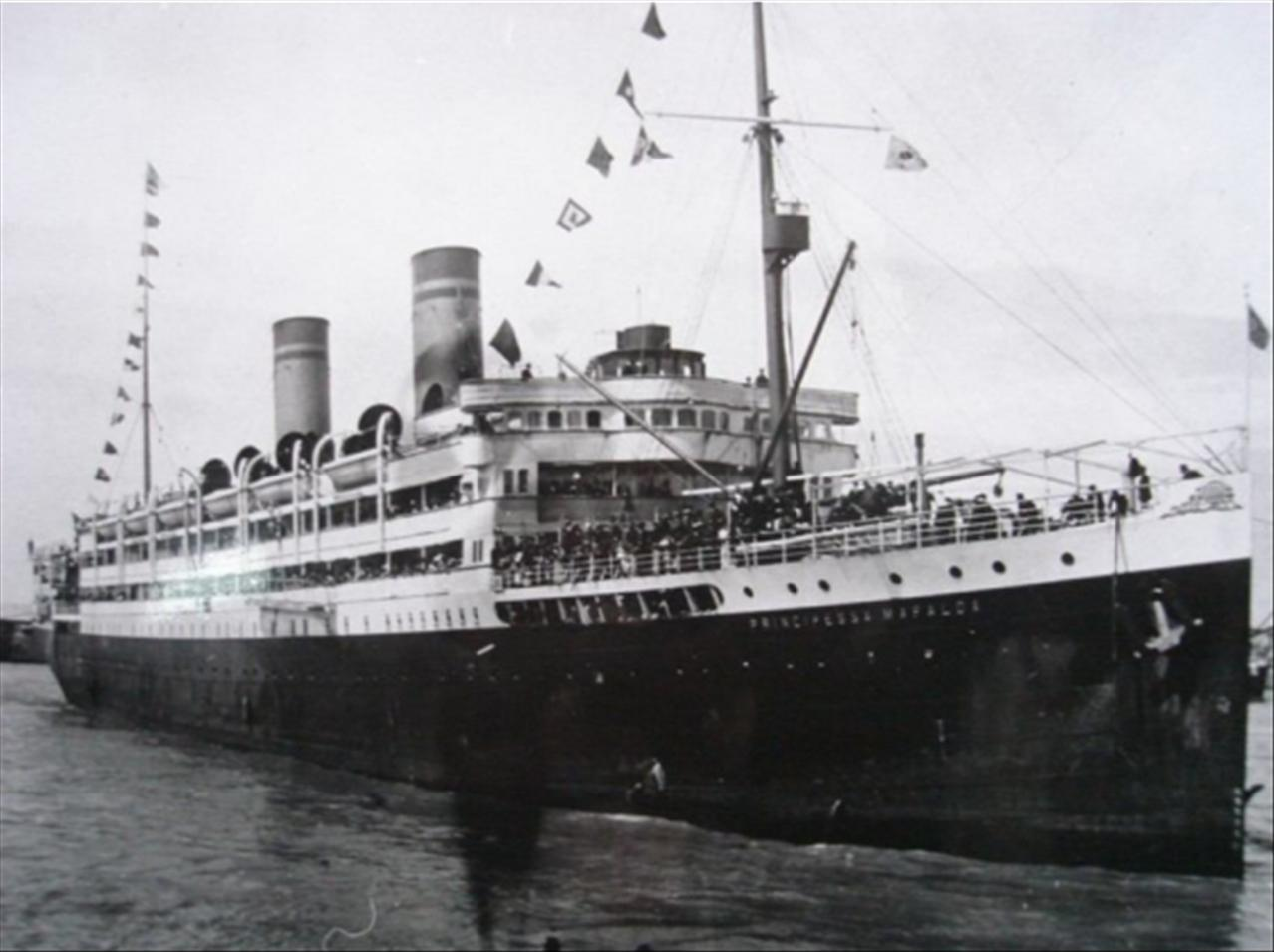
The Principessa Mafalda

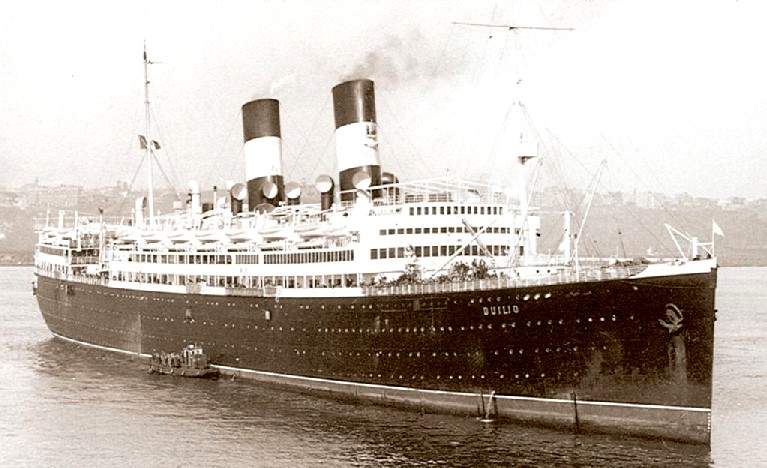
SS Duilio

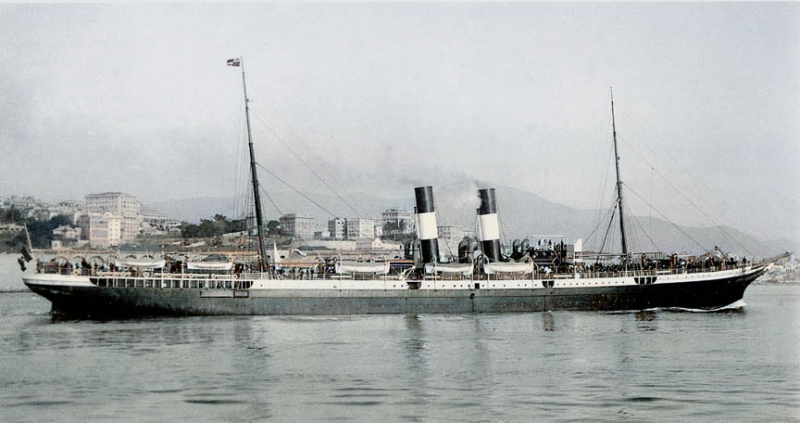
The Regina Margherita
