= SS Empire Star =

History
- Name: Empirestar (1919–30); Empire Star (1930–35); Tudor Star (1935–50)
- Owner: Empirestar Steamship Co. Ltd. (1919–20); Union Cold Storage Co. Ltd. (1920–49); Union International Co. Ltd. (1949–50)
- Operator: Blue Star Line
- Port of registry: London, United Kingdom
- Builder: Lithgows Ltd.
- Yard number: 714
- Launched: 3 June 1919
- Out of service: February 1950
- Identification: United Kingdom Official Number 143407; Code Letters KCLH (1919–34); Code Letters GCTB (1934–50)
- Fate: Scrapped

General characteristics
- Type: Refrigerated cargo liner
- Tonnage: 7,199 GRT, 4,524 NRT
- Length: 423 feet 4 inches (129.03 m)
- Beam: 56 feet 0 inches (17.07 m)
- Draught: 28 feet 4 inches (8.64 m)
- Depth: 28 feet 7 inches (8.71 m)
- Installed power: Triple expansion steam engine, 696nhp
- Propulsion: Single screw propeller
- Speed: 12.5 knots (23.2 km/h)
- Capacity: 388,163 cubic feet (10,991.6 m^{3}) refrigerated cargo space
- Armament: 1 x 4-inch gun, 1 x 12-pounder Bofors gun, 4 x machine guns, kites (WWII)

The SS Empire Star was a ship operated by the Blue Star Line. Built in 1919 as Empirestar. It was put in service during 1920 season. The ship was renamed Tudor Star in 1935, when its name was given to a newer ship. In 1950, the ship was sold for scrap and transferred to the Netherlands to be broken up.

== Description ==
The ship was 423 feet 4 inches (129.03 m) long, with a beam of 56 feet 0 inches (17.07 m). It had a depth of 28 feet 7 inches (8.71 m), and a draught of 28 feet 4 inches (8.64 m). It was powered by a triple expansion steam engine, which had cylinders of 25 1/2 inches (65 cm), 44 inches (110 cm) and 71 inches (180 cm) diameter by 51 inches (130 cm) stroke. The engine was rated at 696 nhp, 3,500ihp, and drove a single screw propeller, giving the ship a speed of 12.5 knots (23.2 km/h). It was built by J. G. Kincaid & Co., Greenock, Renfrewshire. Steam was supplied by four Scotch boilers. The ship had a capacity of 388,163 cubic feet (10,991.6 m^{3}) refrigerated cargo space. Insulation was by air, brine and granulated cork. Refrigeration machinery was by the Liverpool Refrigeration Co. Ltd and was of the ammonia type.

== History ==
The ship was a refrigerated cargo liner. It was built as yard number 714 by Lithgows Ltd, Port Glasgow. It was launched on 3 June 1919. The ship was built for the Empirestar Steamship Co. Ltd. and was always operated under the management of the Blue Star Line. Its port of registry was London. The United Kingdom Official Number 143407 was allocated, as were the Code Letters KCLH.

On 14 April 1920, Empirestar was sold to the Union Cold Storage Co. Ltd. On 25 October 1927, the Italian ocean liner Principessa Mafalda sprang a leak in the Atlantic Ocean off the coast of Brazil due to its propeller shaft breaking. The ship sank in four hours with the loss of 314 lives. Empirestar was one of the ships that rescued survivors, rescuing 202 people.

The ship was renamed Empire Star on 19 February 1930. In 1934, the Code Letters were changed to GCTB. On 12 February 1934, Empire Star suffered a fractured propeller shaft and lost its propeller when 180 nautical miles (330 km) west of the Fastnet Rock (50°41′N 14°15′W). Blue Star ship Gaelic Star went to the assistance of Empire Star. Gaelic Star took Empire Star in tow for Queenstown, County Cork, Ireland. They arrived on 16 February.

On 1 November 1935, Empire Star was renamed Tudor Star, allowing its former name to be used for the new Empire Star. On 11 April 1936, Tudor Star was at Port Elizabeth, Union of South Africa, due to sail that day. Eleven firemen and trimmers failed to return to the ship on time, causing its sailing to be delayed by a day. They were in dispute with the ship's captain over the advancement of pay. When the ship returned to the United Kingdom, they were charged with disobeying lawful commands and sentenced to eight weeks' imprisonment each. In August 1938, the ship caught fire at Tientsin, China. Wartime armament consisted of 1 x 4-in gun, 1 x 12-pounder Bofors gun, 4 x machine guns, and kites. (Note: Either paravanes, or Saul's barrage kites.) Little is known of the ship's wartime service. It was a member of Convoy MKS 73G, which departed from Gibraltar on 26 December 1944 and arrived at Liverpool, Lancashire on 4 January 1945.

Its owners became Union International Ltd. in 1949. In December 1949, the ship was being used as a store ship at a British port (London, Liverpool or Avonmouth), due to cold stores ashore being full. The ship was sold to N.V. Scheepsloperijen Machinehandel for scrapping in 1950. It arrived at Hendrik-Ido-Ambacht, South Holland, Netherlands on 24 February. Scrapping commenced three days later.
