= SS Giulio Cesare =

Italian ocean liner (1920–1944)

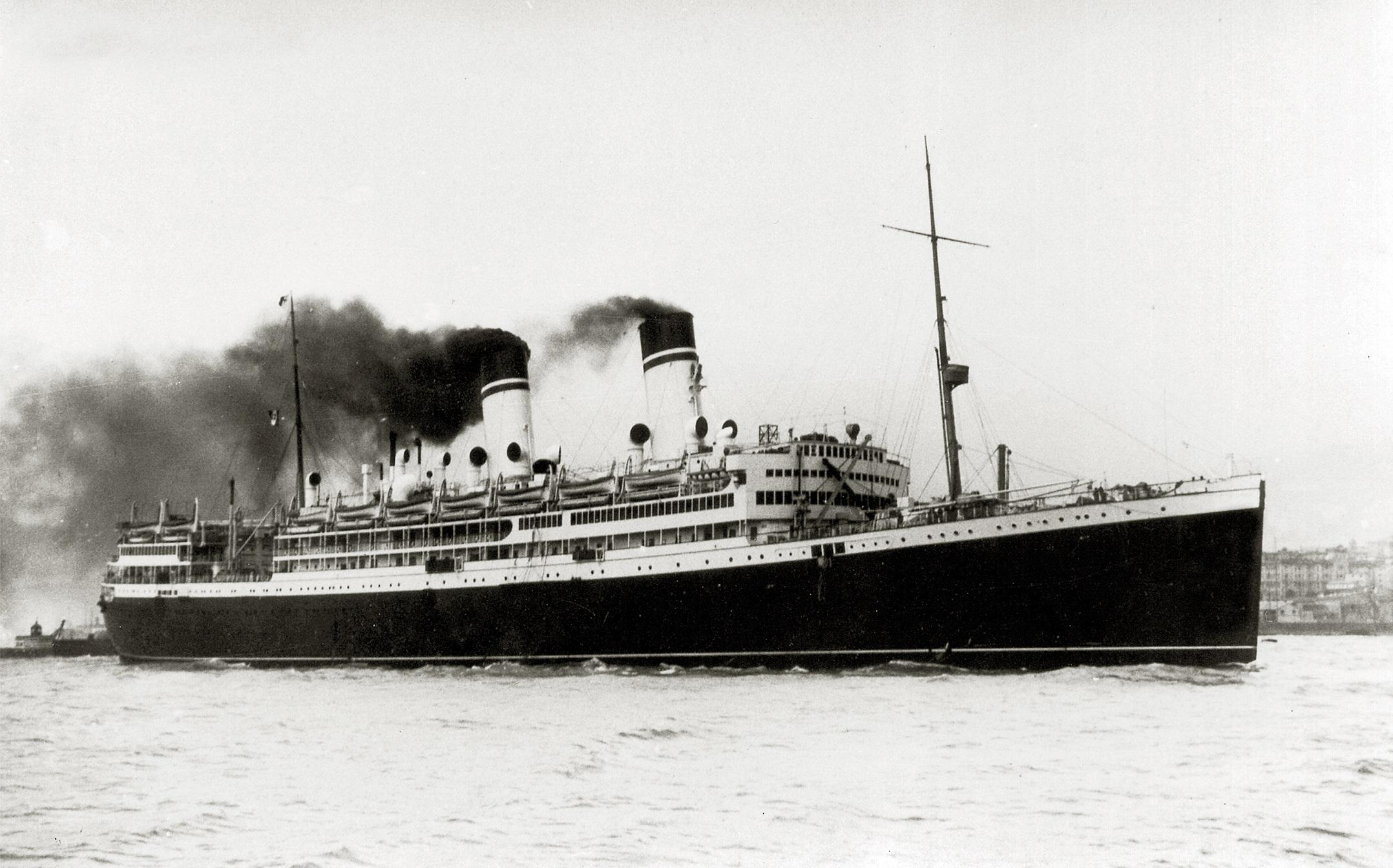
- SS Giulio Cesare

History

Italy
- Name: SS Giulio Cesare
- Namesake: Julius Caesar
- Owner: 1922-1932: Navigazione Generale Italiana; 1932-1942: Italian Line; 1942-1944: International Red Cross
- Port of registry: Italy
- Route: Italy-South America & Cruising
- Ordered: 1920
- Builder: Swan Hunter & Wigham Richardson, Ltd, Newcastle-on-Tyne
- Launched: 7 February 1920
- Completed: March 1922
- Maiden voyage: 4 May 1922
- Home port: Genoa
- Fate: Sunk by Allied air attack 28 August 1944

General characteristics
- Type: Ocean liner
- Tonnage: 22,576 GRT
- Length: 636 ft (193.9 m)
- Beam: 76.15 ft (23.2 m)
- Depth: 66.3 ft (20.2 m)
- Decks: 4
- Installed power: 4 sets of geared steam turbines manufactured by Wallsend Slipway; 6 boilers D.E. & four boilers S.E. creating 220lb of steam pressure by Wallsend Slipway & Engineering Company Ltd. Newcastle-on-Tyne; 21,800 shp (16,300 kW)
- Propulsion: 4 × screw
- Speed: 20 knots (37 km/h; 23 mph)
- Capacity: Total passengers: First Class: 244; Second Class: 306; Tourist Class:1800
- Notes: Paintwork: White hull and upper works; Boot-topping green; Funnels white with red and black tops and narrow green band

SS Giulio Cesare was a liner of the Navigazione Generale Italiana, which was later operated by the Italian Line. The ship was used to transport first class, second class, and tourist-class passengers.

== Features ==
A feature of this ship was the Club situated on the boat-deck, with a bar. The ship also featured a saloon dining room, galleries, a ballroom, and other function rooms. Second class was situated amidships. Talkie apparatus were also fitted to the ship and a long-distance wireless telephone was also available. The tourist class accommodation was situated astern and also had several public rooms. The tourist passengers shared an open-air swimming pool with the 2nd class passengers.

== Service history ==
The ship was used on Genoa-Naples-South America voyages but also served North American ports. Until 1925 the SS Giulio Cesare and the SS Duilio were the two largest ships in the Italian merchant fleet.

During June and July 1927, the ship was used to transport Spanish football club Real Madrid from Barcelona to South America for their exhibition tour of the Americas.

In November 1933, she was reconditioned and made ready to serve on the Mediterranean-South Africa Service. In 1935, she collided with the German steamship Barenfels in the harbour of Gibraltar. This collision was deemed to be the fault of the German steamship and the captain and crew were detained along with the ship.

In 1942, during the Second World War, SS Giulio Cesare was chartered to the International Red Cross for a time before being laid-up in the port of Trieste. SS Giulio Cesare was sunk by SAAF Beaufighters from No. 16 Squadron on 28 August 1944. Upon returning from their mission, the airmen who sank the ship were reprimanded as their commanders believed that they had sunk a hospital ship.

== Gallery ==
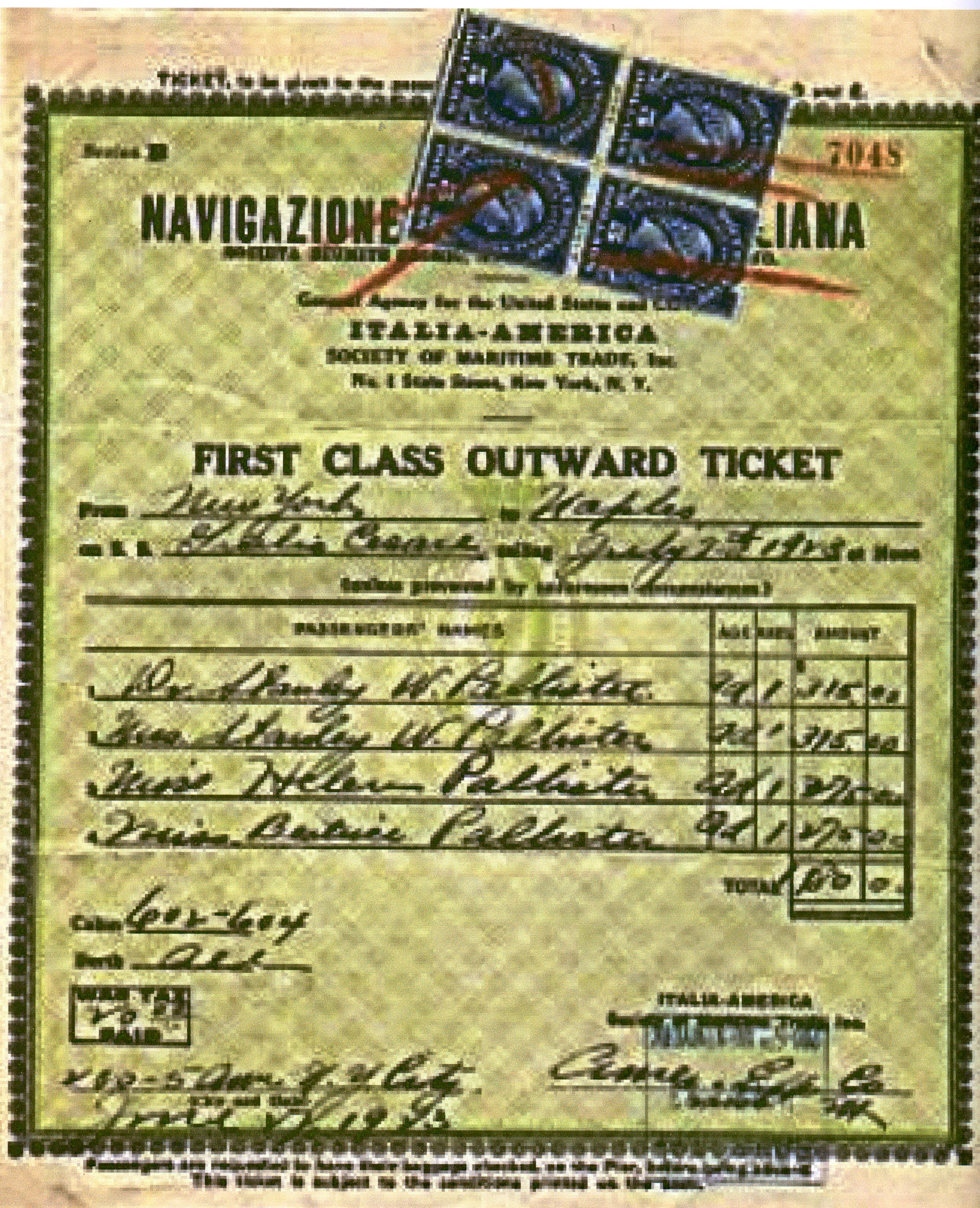
First Class Outward Ticket Series B for S.S. Giulio Cesare sailing on 7 July 1923 from New York to Naples, Italy

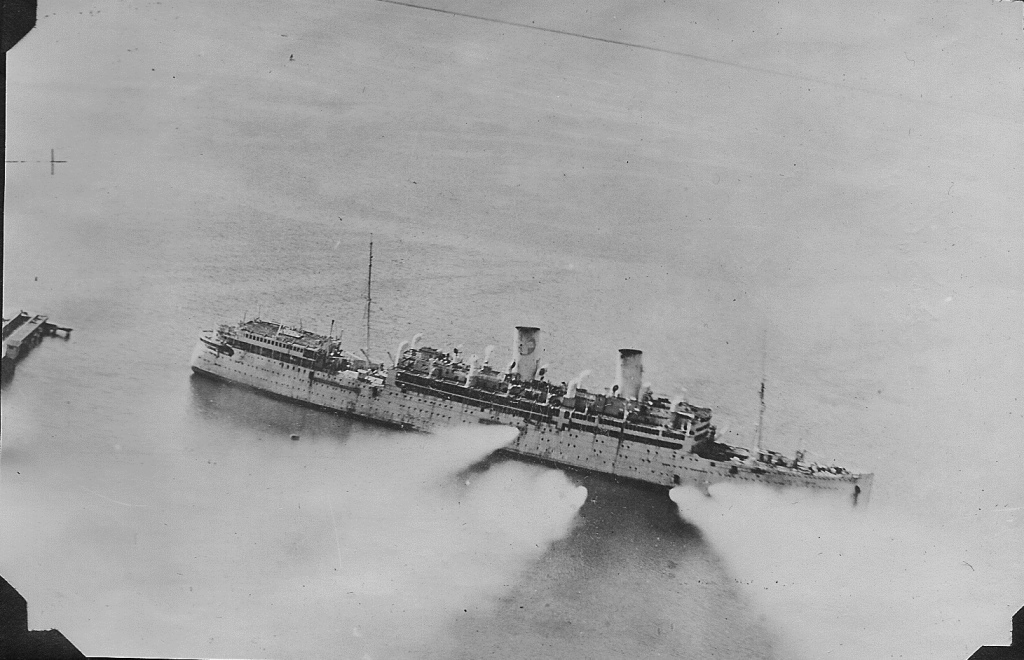
Final rocket attack on 28 August 1944

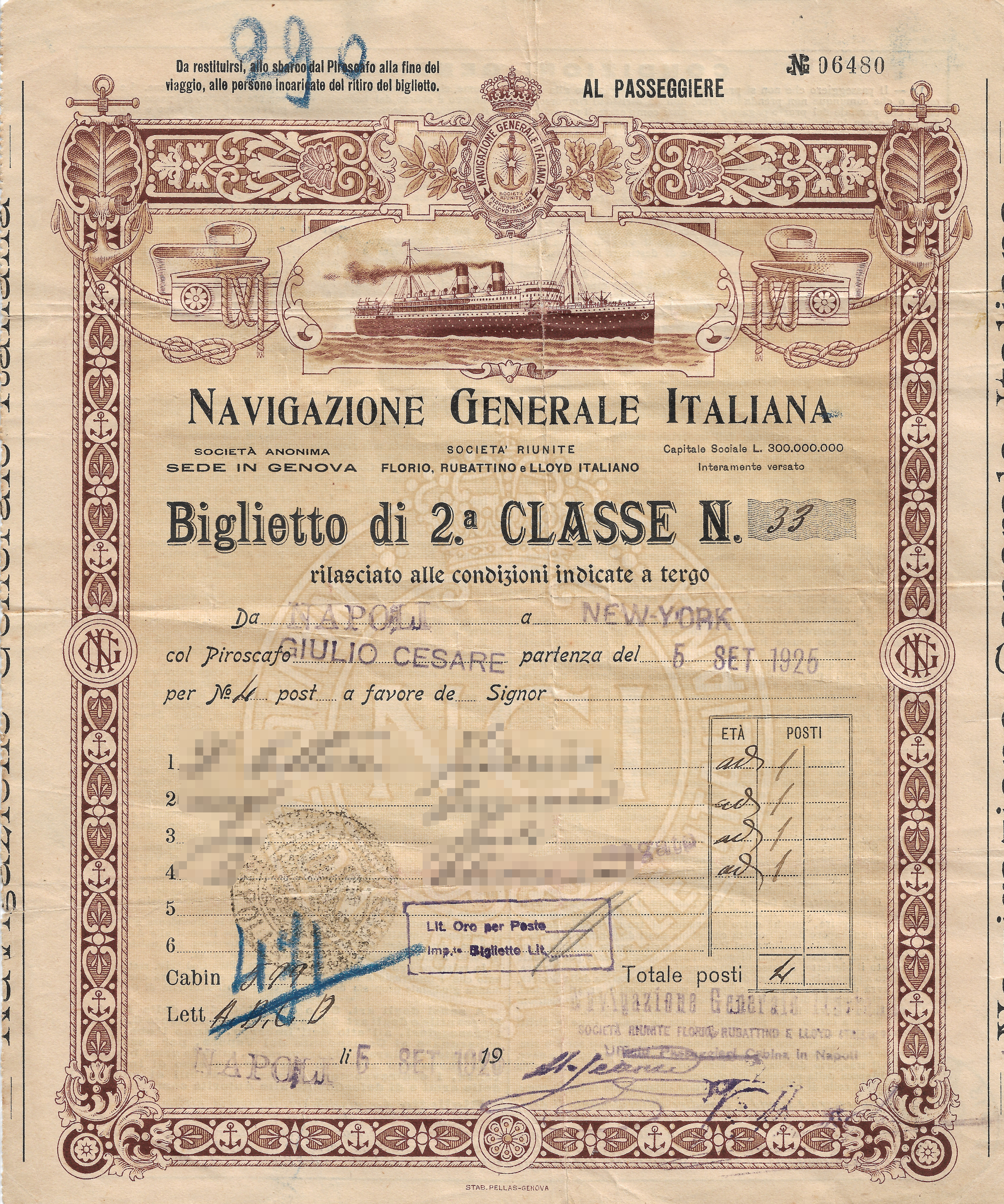
The front of a Second Class Ticket for S.S. Giulio Cesare that sailed on 5 September 1925 from Naples, Italy to New York.

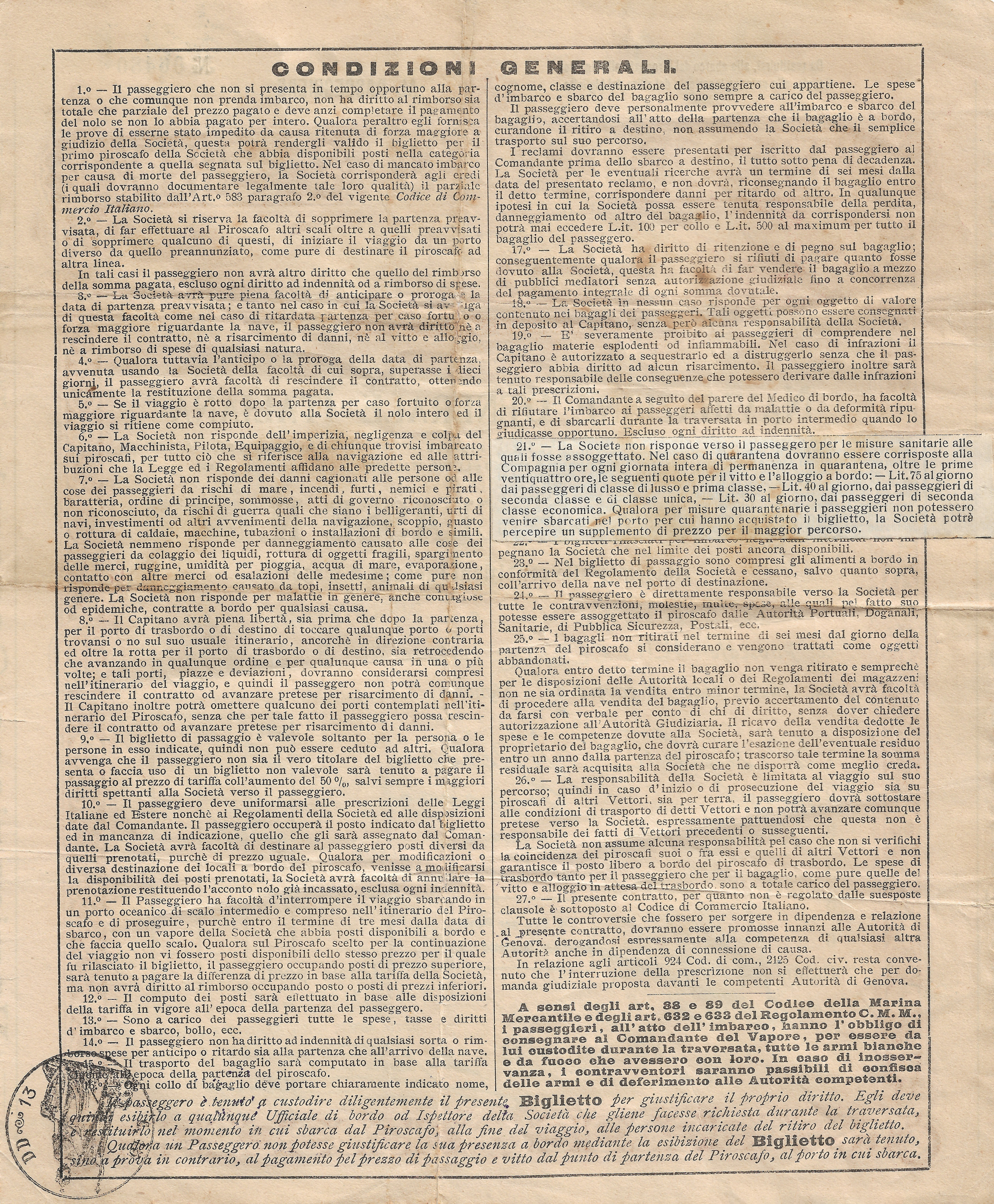
The back of a Second Class Ticket for S.S. Giulio Cesare that sailed on 5 September 1925 from Naples, Italy to New York.

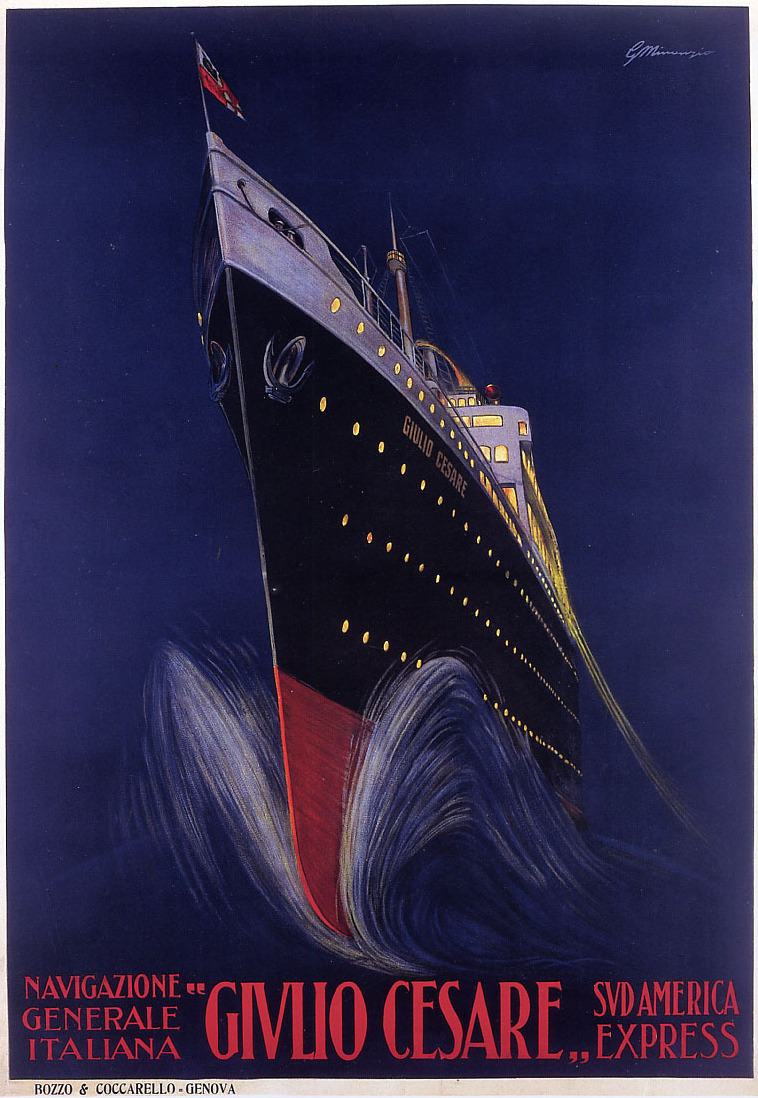
Poster advertisign SS Giulio Cesare by Mario Borgoni, c.1920
