= SM U-14 (Austria-Hungary) =

Austro-Hungarian Navy's submarine (former French Brumaire class submarine)

- An Austro-Hungarian wartime postcard of the submarine in Austro-Hungarian Navy service as SM U-14

History

France
- Name: Curie
- Namesake: Pierre and Marie Curie
- Ordered: 1906
- Builder: Arsenal de Toulon, Toulon
- Launched: 18 July 1912
- Completed: 1914
- Identification: Q 87
- Captured: 20 December 1914
- Acquired: Returned from Austria-Hungary, 17 July 1919
- Stricken: March 1928
- Fate: Scrapped 1929

Austria-Hungary
- Name: SM U-14
- Acquired: Captured, 20 December 1914
- Commissioned: June 1915
- Refit: February–November 1916
- Fate: Returned to France, 17 July 1919

Service record as SM U-14
- Commanders: Otto Zeidler; 1 June – 14 October 1915; Georg Ritter von Trapp; 14 October 1915 – 13 January 1918; Friedrich Schlosser; 13 January – 8 June 1918; Hugo Pistel; 19 June – 1 November 1918
- Victories: 11 merchant ships sunk (47,653 GRT)

General characteristics as Curie
- Class & type: Brumaire-class submarine
- Displacement: 397 t (391 long tons), surfaced; 551 t (542 long tons) submerged
- Length: 170 ft 11 in (52.10 m)
- Beam: 17 ft 9 in (5.41 m)
- Draft: 10 ft 2 in (3.10 m), surfaced
- Propulsion: 2 × propeller shafts; 2 × license-built MAN 6-cylinder diesel engines, surfaced, 480 bhp (360 kW) total; 2 × electric motors, submerged, 360 shp (270 kW) total
- Speed: 13 knots (24 km/h; 15 mph), surfaced; 8.8 knots (16.3 km/h; 10.1 mph), submerged
- Range: 1,700 nmi (3,100 km) at 10 knots (19 km/h), surfaced; 84 nmi (156 km) at 5 knots (9.3 km/h), submerged
- Complement: 29
- Armament: 1 × 17.7 in (450 mm) bow torpedo tube, up to 8 torpedoes

General characteristics as SM U-14
- Displacement: 397 t (391 long tons), surfaced; 551 t (542 long tons) submerged
- Length: 170 ft 1 in (51.84 m)
- Beam: 17 ft 1 in (5.21 m)
- Draft: 10 ft 6 in (3.20 m), surfaced
- Propulsion: 2 × propeller shafts; 2 × diesel engines, surfaced, 480 bhp (360 kW) total; 2 × electric motors, submerged, 360 shp (270 kW) total; After modernization: 2 × diesel engines, surfaced, 840 bhp (630 kW) total; 2 × electric motors, submerged, 660 shp (490 kW) total
- Speed: 12.2 knots (22.6 km/h; 14.0 mph), surfaced; 8.8 knots (16.3 km/h; 10.1 mph), submerged; After modernization: 12.6 knots (23.3 km/h; 14.5 mph), surfaced
- Range: 1,700 nmi (3,100 km) at 10 knots (19 km/h), surfaced; 84 nmi (156 km) at 5 knots (9.3 km/h), submerged; After modernization: 6,500 nmi (12,000 km) at 10 knots (19 km/h), surfaced
- Complement: 28
- Armament: 1 × 53.3 cm (21 in) bow torpedo tube; 6 × externally mounted 53.3 cm (21 in) torpedo launchers; 7 × torpedoes

SM U-14 or U-XIV was a U-boat or submarine of the Austro-Hungarian Navy during the First World War. She was launched in 1912 as the French Brumaire-class submarine Curie (Q 87), but captured and rebuilt for service in the Austro-Hungarian Navy. At war's end, the submarine was returned to France and restored to her former name.

Curie was launched in July 1912 at Toulon and completed in 1914. She measured just under 171 feet (52 m) long and displaced nearly 400 metric tons (390 long tons) on the surface and just over 550 metric tons (540 long tons) when submerged. At the outbreak of the First World War in August 1914, Curie was assigned to duty in the Mediterranean. In mid-December, Curie's commander conceived a plan to infiltrate the Austro-Hungarian Navy's main base at Pola, but during the 20 December attempt, the vessel became ensnared in harbor defenses. Two Austro-Hungarian ships sank Curie, killing three of her crew; the remainder were taken prisoner.

The Austro-Hungarian Navy, which had a small and largely obsolete U-boat fleet, immediately began salvage efforts and succeeded in raising the lightly damaged submarine in early February 1915. After a refit, the boat was commissioned as SM U-14 in June, but had little success early in her career. When her commander fell ill in October, he was replaced by Georg Ritter von Trapp. U-14 was damaged by a depth charge attack in February 1916, and underwent an extensive modernization through November. Resuming duty under von Trapp, U-14 sank her first ship in April 1917, but had her most successful patrol in August, when she sank five ships—including Milazzo, reportedly the largest cargo ship in the world—in a six-day span.

In January 1918, von Trapp was replaced as commander, but neither of his two successors was able to match his accomplishments. In all, U-14 sank 11 ships with a combined gross register tonnage of nearly 48,000 tons. Returned to France at the end of the war, she rejoined the French Navy in July 1919 under her former name of Curie. She remained in service until 1928 and was scrapped in 1929.

== Design and construction ==
Curie was a part of the 16-boat Brumaire class authorized under the 1906 program. The Brumaire-class boats were diesel-powered versions of the steam-powered Pluviôse-class submarines (which had been authorized the year before), and, like the Pluviôse boats, were named after either months of the French Republican Calendar or scientists. Curie was named after Pierre and Marie Curie.

The Bruimaire class was designed by French naval designer Maxime Laubeuf and featured a double hull. The boats were 170 feet 11 inches (52.10 m) long, 17 feet 9 inches (5.41 m) abeam, with a draft of 10 feet 2 inches (3.10 m) when surfaced. They had a displacement of 397 metric tons (391 long tons) surfaced and 551 metric tons (542 long tons) submerged. Curie, like the other 15 submarines of the class, featured one 17.7-inch (450 mm) bow torpedo tube and could carry as many as eight torpedoes. As built, Curie did not have a deck gun.

The Brumaire class featured twin propeller shafts driven by two French license-built MAN 6-cylinder diesel engines on the surface, or by two electric motors when submerged. Curie's diesel engines generated a total of 840 brake horsepower (630 kW) and could move the submarine at up to 13 knots (24 km/h; 15 mph) on the surface; her electric motors generated 660 shaft horsepower (490 kW) and could propel the boat up to 8.8 knots (16.3 km/h; 10.1 mph) submerged. While traveling on the surface at 10 knots (19 km/h; 12 mph), Curie had a range of 1,700 nautical miles (3,100 km; 2,000 mi); the submarine's range while submerged was 84 nautical miles (156 km; 97 mi) at 5 knots (9.3 km/h; 5.8 mph).

Curie was laid down at the Arsenal de Toulon and launched on 18 July 1912, completed by 1914, and commissioned into the French Navy.

== French career and sinking ==
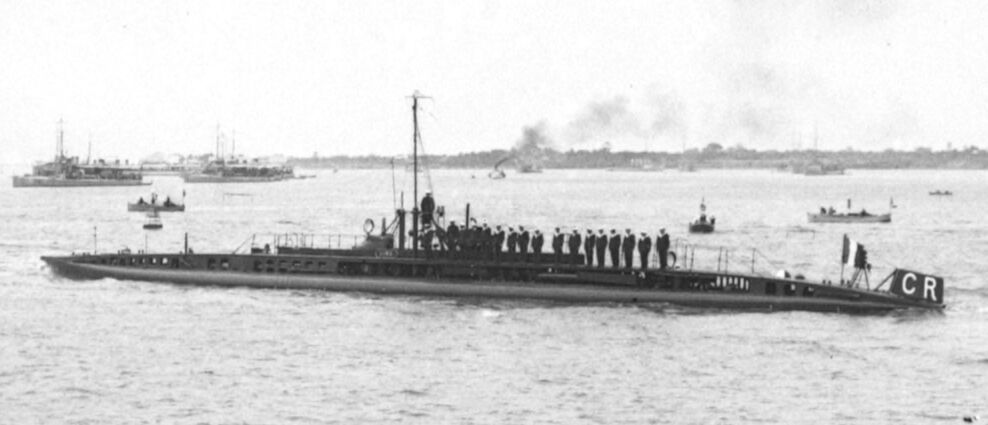
Curie at sea near Toulon, May 1914.

Like all the Brumaire-class submarines, Curie began her First World War service in the Mediterranean, and was one of the first French submarines to appear in the Adriatic.

On 17 December 1914, Curie, at the insistence of her French-Irish commander Gabriel O'Byrne, departed her base in the Ionian Sea under tow by the French armored cruiser Jules Michelet. Depositing her charge 150 nautical miles (280 km; 170 mi) from Pola, the site of the Austro-Hungarian Navy's main base, Jules Michelet departed, leaving Curie to proceed to the Austro-Hungarian base. Curie arrived the next day and began reconnoitering the entrance to the harbor. O'Byrne observed the entrance and exit paths of Austro-Hungarian vessels and plotted a course through the deployed defensive mines. On 19 December, O'Byrne took Curie in to observe the anti-submarine net that ran across the opening in a long, defensive breakwater built to keep submarines from infiltrating the naval base.

Believing that he had accounted for all of the defensive measures, O'Byrne took Curie to a depth of 65 feet (20 m) early on 20 December and, attempting an incursion into the harbor, heard the sounds of chains and wires dragging on the submarine's hull. When the sounds stopped after half a minute, O'Byrne brought Curie up to periscope depth to discover that he had only penetrated the outer net. Curie's forward momentum carried her into the second net where she became "inextricably entangled". When the submarine, still trapped in the net, was forced to surface for fresh air, Curie came under fire from the Austro-Hungarian destroyer Magnet and torpedo boat Tb 63 T which quickly sank her. Three of the twenty-six men on board were killed in the attack; the survivors — who included Curie's commander, O'Byrne — were all taken prisoner.^{[Note 1]}

== Salvage and Austro-Hungarian career ==
At the beginning of the First World War, the Austro-Hungarian Navy's U-boat fleet consisted of six largely experimental submarines of three classes.^{[Note 2]} The Navy had five larger, more modern submarines (what would have been the U-7 class) under construction in Germany at the outbreak of war, but when the Navy became convinced that delivery of the U-7 boats would be impossible, they were sold to Germany in November 1914.^{[Note 3]}

Amidst Austro-Hungarian efforts to replace the now-unavailable U-7 boats,^{[Note 4]} the largely intact Curie, resting at a depth of 39 metres (128 ft), became the focus of salvage efforts. Beginning on 21 December, the day after Curie's sinking, salvage crews raised the submarine in stages, finally bringing her to the surface on 2 February 1915.

The former Curie, now assigned the designation U-14, was reconditioned and commissioned into the Austro-Hungarian Navy under the command of Korvettenkapitän Otto Zeidler on 1 June. Zeidler remained in command until he fell ill, and was replaced in mid-October by Linienschiffsleutnant Georg Ritter von Trapp.^{[Note 5]} Under Zeidler's command and the first months of von Trapp's command, U-14 had no successes.

In early February 1916, U-14 joined U-4 for a patrol near Durazzo. U-4 came closest to scoring a success when she narrowly missed hitting HMS Lowestoft, a British Birmingham-class cruiser on 7 February. U-14 survived a depth charge attack, but made it back to port with all of her externally mounted torpedoes crushed and both fuel tanks leaking.

When she put in for repairs, U-14 was extensively modernized in a refit that kept her in port from February to November. The submarine was given a German-style conning tower that replaced the French-designed wet lookout platform. She was equipped with more powerful diesel engines, which increased her power output from 480 to 840 brake horsepower (360 to 630 kW). U-14's fighting potential was further enhanced by the installation of larger fuel tanks, which nearly quadrupled her range to 6,500 nautical miles (12,000 km), up from her former maximum of 1,700 nautical miles (3,100 km).

On 28 April 1917, U-14 was patrolling off the coast of Greece when she scored her first success, Teakwood, a 5,315-ton British tanker headed from Port Arthur, Texas, to Port Said. On 3 May, on patrol in the same vicinity, von Trapp and U-14 sank another ship, this one the 1,905-ton Italian steamer Antonio Sciesa.

In another patrol in July, U-14 sailed on the north side of the island of Corfu while headed for Santi Quaranta, Albania. Because the harbor at Corfu was occupied by the French fleet at the time, U-14 conducted a ruse de guerre by flying the submarine's former national flag, the French tricolor, in order to pass unmolested. Even though U-14's new conning tower made her look unlike any other Brumaire-class boat, one French patrol plane was successfully fooled by the ruse. When U-14's crew first spotted the aircraft, flying towards them from the direction of the sun, there was not enough time to submerge. As the aircraft drew near, its French markings—and its cargo of bombs—became apparent to the crew. With no other course of action possible, U-14's crew waved their hats and handkerchiefs at the plane. As the French pilot passed overhead, he returned the waves, apparently unaware of the U-boat's true nationality. The only success by U-14 on this cruise was the sinking of Marionga Goulandris, a Greek steamer, near Cape Matapan.

U-14's next war patrol was very successful, sinking five ships with a combined tonnage of 24,814, over half of her total tonnage sunk. U-14 departed from the submarine base at Cattaro on 20 August and headed through the Straits of Otranto, successfully evading the Otranto Barrage, and Allied blockade of the passageway between Italy and Albania. Heading into the Ionian Sea, von Trapp and U-14 sank the French steamer Constance on 23 August 142 nautical miles (263 km; 163 mi) northeast of Malta. The following day, U-14 sank Kilwinning, a British steamer loaded with coal and a general cargo headed for Port Said. Two days after that, the British steamer Titian was sunk by U-14 while on en route to Alexandria. U-14's next victim was the British steamer Nairn. The 3,627-ton turret deck ship, on her way from Malta to Port Said with coal, was sunk on the night of 27/28 August 125 nautical miles (232 km; 144 mi) from Benghazi.

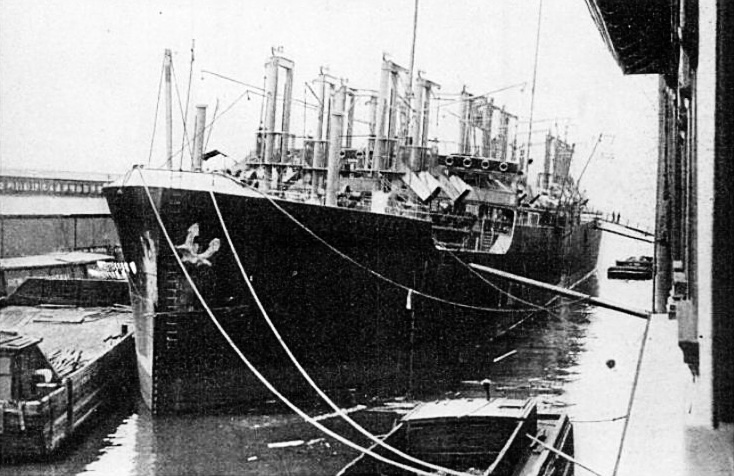
The Italian cargo ship Milazzo was the largest ship sunk by U-14

On 29 August, von Trapp sank the Italian steamer Milazzo 250 nautical miles (460 km; 290 mi) east of Malta. Milazzo, at 11,744 tons, was the largest ship sunk by U-14, and among the largest ships sunk by a U-boat in World War I. Milazzo, reported by The New York Times in 1916 as the largest cargo ship in the world, was the second-largest ship sunk by an Austro-Hungarian submarine.^{[Note 6]} U-14 concluded her patrol on 1 September, when she returned to Cattaro.

U-14 sank three more ships during a five-day span in October. On 19 October, U-14 sank the British ship Elsiston 150 nautical miles (280 km; 170 mi) from Malta. One person aboard Elsiston, which was carrying military stores between Malta and Suda Bay, was killed in the attack. Nearby, and on the same day, von Trapp sank the 3,618-ton Good Hope, a British ship laden with iron ore for Middlesbrough. The next ship sunk by U-14 was the Italian steamer Capo di Monte, sunk 100 nautical miles (190 km; 120 mi) from Candia while on her way from Karachi to Malta.

In January 1918, Friedrich Schlosser replaced von Trapp as commander of U-14. Schlosser was, in turn, replaced in June by Hugo Pistel, who remained in command until the end of the war. Neither of the later commanders was able to duplicate von Trapp's success in U-14; the U-boat sank no more ships through the rest of the war.

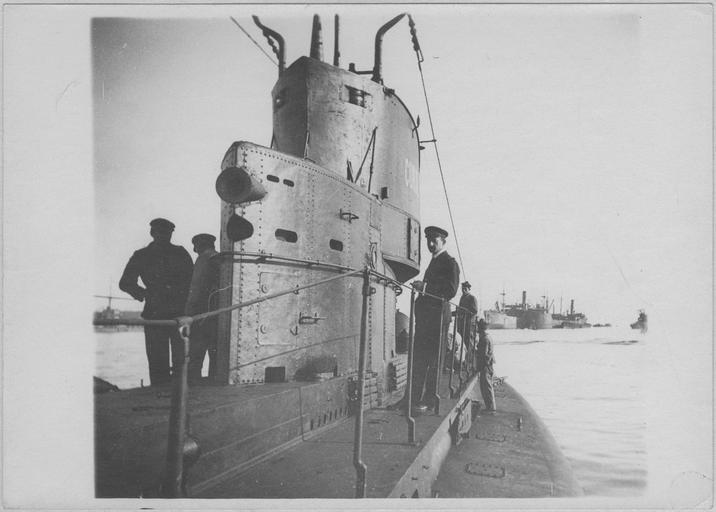
U-14 being returned to France, in Corfu.

After Austria-Hungary's surrender and the end of the First World War, U-14 was returned to France and on 17 July 1919 rejoined the French Navy under her former name of Curie. She was stricken in 1928 and scrapped in 1929.

== Summary of raiding history ==
Ships sunk or damaged by SM U-14
Date	Name	Nationality	Tonnage	Fate
28 April 1917	Teakwood	United Kingdom	5,315	Sunk
3 May 1917	Antonio Sciesa	Kingdom of Italy	1,905	Sunk
5 July 1917	Marionga Goulandris	Greece	3,191	Sunk
23 August 1917	Constance	France	2,469	Sunk
24 August 1917	Kilwinning	United Kingdom	3,071	Sunk
26 August 1917	Titian	United Kingdom	4,170	Sunk
28 August 1917	Nairn	United Kingdom	3,627	Sunk
29 August 1917	Milazzo	Kingdom of Italy	11,477	Sunk
19 October 1917	Elsiston	United Kingdom	2,908	Sunk
19 October 1917	Good Hope	United Kingdom	3,618	Sunk
23 October 1917	Capo Di Monte	Kingdom of Italy	5,902	Sunk
		Total:	47,653	

== Notes ==
^Note 1 The French submarine Pierre Chailley, laid down in May 1917 and launched in December 1922, was named in honor of Curie's second officer, one of the three men killed in the sinking. A second submarine, O'Byrne, was named for Curie's late commander, who had died in France in 1917 after being released from Austro-Hungarian captivity.

^Note 2 There were two submarines each of the U-1, U-3, and U-5 classes.

^Note 3 In April 1915, just five months later, the German U-21 successfully entered the Mediterranean through the Straits of Gibraltar, proving that delivery would have been possible after all.

^Note 4 During this time, Austria-Hungary was engaged in protracted negotiations with Germany in efforts to secure purchase of German Type UB 1 boats.

^Note 5 Later known as the patriarch of the von Trapp family made famous in the musical The Sound of Music and its subsequent film adaptation, von Trapp was already known by name in newspapers for the sinking the French armored cruiser Léon Gambetta in April while in command of U-5.

^Note 6 The largest, the French armored cruiser Léon Gambetta, was, coincidentally, sunk by von Trapp while in command of U-5 in April 1915.

== Bibliography ==
- Baumgartner, Lothar; Erwin Sieche (1999). Die Schiffe der k.(u.)k. Kriegsmarine im Bild = Austro-Hungarian warships in photographs (in German). Vienna: Verlagsbuchhandlung Stöhr. ISBN 978-3-901208-25-6. OCLC 43596931.
- Compton-Hall, Richard (2004) [1991]. Submarines at war, 1914–18. Penzance: Periscope Publishing. ISBN 978-1-904381-21-1. OCLC 57639764.
- Couhat, Jean Labayle (1974). French Warships of World War I. London: Ian Allan. ISBN 0-7110-0445-5.
- Gardiner, Robert, ed. (1985). Conway's All the World's Fighting Ships 1906–1921. Annapolis, Maryland: Naval Institute Press. ISBN 978-0-87021-907-8. OCLC 12119866.
- Garier, Gérard (2002). A l'épreuve de la Grande Guerre. L'odyssée technique et humaine du sous-marin en France (in French). Vol. 3–2. Bourg-en-Bresse, France: Marines édition. ISBN 2-909675-81-5.
- Garier, Gérard (1998). Des Émeraude (1905-1906) au Charles Brun (1908–1933). L'odyssée technique et humaine du sous-marin en France (in French). Vol. 2. Bourg-en-Bresse, France: Marines édition. ISBN 2-909675-34-3.
- Gibson, R. H.; Prendergast, Maurice (2003) [1931]. The German Submarine War, 1914–1918. Annapolis, Maryland: Naval Institute Press. ISBN 978-1-59114-314-7. OCLC 52924732.
- Sieche, Erwin F. (1980). "Austro-Hungarian Submarines". Warship, Volume 2. Naval Institute Press. ISBN 978-0-87021-976-4. OCLC 233144055.
- Stern, Robert Cecil (2007). The Hunter Hunted: Submarine versus Submarine: Encounters from World War I to the Present. Annapolis, Maryland: Naval Institute Press. ISBN 978-1-59114-379-6. OCLC 123127537.
- von Trapp, Georg (2007) [1935]. To the Last Salute: Memories of an Austrian U-Boat Commander. Lincoln, Nebraska: University of Nebraska Press. ISBN 978-0-8032-4667-6. OCLC 70866865.
