= Fort Punta Christo =

Austro-Hungarian fortification

Coordinates: 44.8919°N 13.7975°E

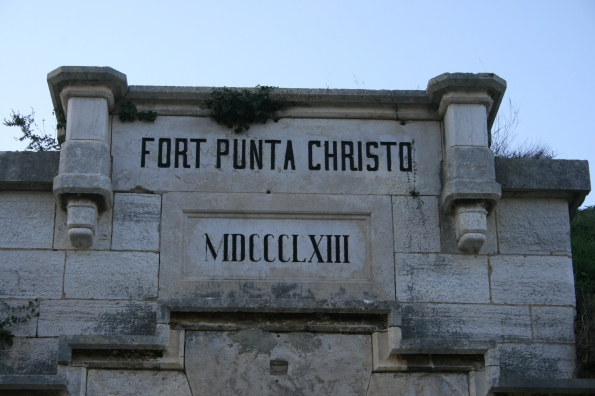
The entrance to Fort Punta Christo.

Fort Punta Christo is an Austro-Hungarian fortification located in the city of Pula, Croatia. Christo was originally built on the Kristo Peninsula in 1833, and was just a Martello tower. The fort as we see it today started to take form in 1847, when 27 rooms were added to the fort. Punta Christo was added to in 1857 and 1880, and the fort became the heavily armed and armored fort we see today.

== Armament ==
- Two 28 cm L/35 guns in armored minimal embrasures located in the center of the fort
- Two 28 cm L/22 guns in barbettes
- Two 24 cm L/22 howitzers in a casemates
- Two 15 cm L/35 howitzers in barbettes
- Eighteen M75/96 9 cm field guns for closer range fire and for landward defense

== Construction ==
Fort Punta Christo was constructed out of stone with the later parts being covered in concrete. The fort has 2 batteries not directly connected to the fort that were added in 1880. These batteries added greater fields of fire. In 1880, an armored tower was constructed with 4 rangefinders that directed the guns. The original entrance was maintained as additions were constructed. The fort is the largest of all fortifications in the Austro-Hungarian Empire, even though it was built in 1833.

== History ==
One of the centers where different parts of the fort met.

Fort Punta Christo didn't see any combat during World War I, and was passed to Italy by the treaties of Saint-Germain-en-Laye and Rapallo in 1919 and 1920, respectively. The fort was abandoned by the Yugoslavian authorities after World War II. Since the early 1990s, Punta Christo has been used for concerts and cultural events. Despite this, the fort remains overgrown and abandoned
