= SS Roma =

SS Roma can refer to various ships:

- SS Roma, built as County of Sutherland in 1873 for R&J Craig, Glasgow, bought by British India Associated Steamers Ltd in 1881 and renamed Roma, broken up 1898
- SS Roma (1926)
- MV Doulos Phos, named Roma between 1948 and 1953
