= MV Empire Star (1935) =

UK refrigerated cargo liner

Coordinates: 48°14′N 26°22′W

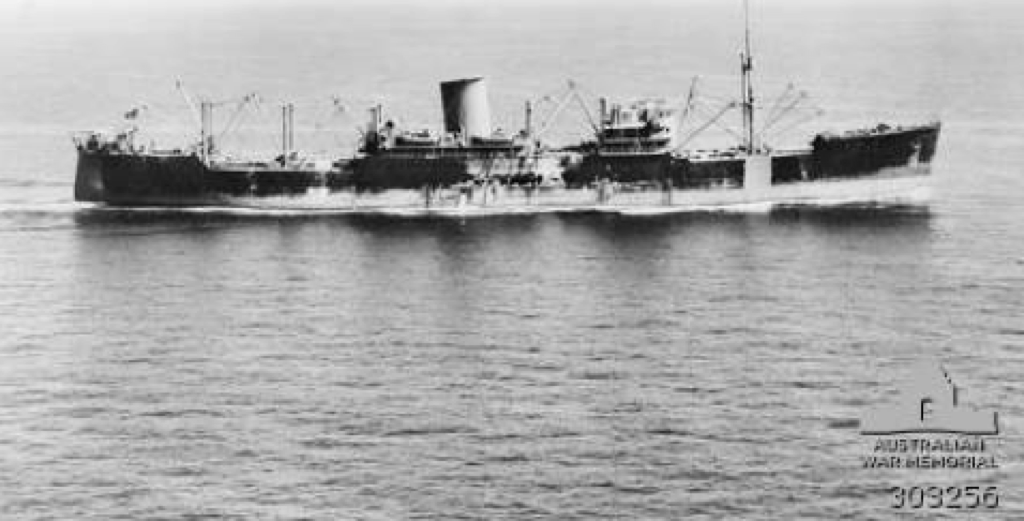
- Empire Star at sea, 23 August 1941

History

United Kingdom
- Name: Empire Star
- Owner: Frederick Leyland & Co, Ltd
- Operator: Blue Star Line
- Port of registry: (United Kingdom) Belfast
- Builder: Harland and Wolff, Belfast
- Yard number: 957
- Launched: 26 September 1935
- Completed: December 1935
- Identification: UK official number 163219; Call sign MKMN
- Fate: Torpedoed and sunk, 23 October 1942

General characteristics
- Class & type: Imperial Star-class cargo ship
- Tonnage: 12,656 GRT; tonnage under deck 11,397; 9,187 NRT
- Length: 524.2 ft (159.8 m) p/p
- Beam: 70.4 ft (21.5 m)
- Draught: 43 ft 5 in (13.2 m)
- Depth: 32.3 ft (9.8 m)
- Installed power: 2,463 NHP
- Propulsion: 2 × 6-cylinder marine diesel engines; twin screws
- Crew: 75 + 9 DEMS gunners (1942)
- Sensors & processing systems: wireless direction finding; echo sounding device; gyrocompass
- Armament: (as DEMS): 1 × 4-inch gun; 1 × 12-pounder gun; 2 × Oerlikon 20 mm cannon; 5 × machine guns
- Notes: sister ships: Australia Star, Sydney Star, Wellington Star, Auckland Star

Service record
- Operations: Evacuation of Singapore, 1942

MV Empire Star was a UK refrigerated cargo liner. She was built by Harland and Wolff in 1935 as one of Blue Star Line's Imperial Star-class ships, designed to ship frozen meat from Australia and New Zealand to the United Kingdom. She served in the Second World War and is distinguished for her role in the Evacuation of Singapore in February 1942. She was sunk by torpedo in October 1942 with the loss of 42 lives.

She was the second of three Blue Star ships to be called Empire Star. The first Empire Star was a steamship that was built in 1919, renamed Tudor Star in 1935 and scrapped in 1950. The third Empire Star was a replacement Imperial Star-class ship that was built in 1946 and scrapped in 1971.

== Building ==
Harland and Wolff in Belfast built Empire Star, launching her on 26 September 1935 and completing her in December. She was owned by Frederick Leyland & Co, a ship-owning company controlled by Blue Star Line.

The Imperial Star class were motor ships. Empire Star had a pair of six-cylinder two-stroke single-acting marine Diesel engines developing a total of 2,463 NHP and driving twin screws. The engines were built by Harland and Wolff but were a Burmeister & Wain design from Denmark. Her navigation equipment included wireless direction finding, an echo sounding device and a gyrocompass.

== Second World War service ==
Empire Star's regular cargo liner route was from London via South Africa to Australia or New Zealand, returning by the same route laden with frozen meat. En route she tended to call at either Las Palmas or Cape Verde, presumably for bunkering.

During the war it was strategically important to continue meat imports to the UK. However, under wartime conditions Brisbane Star's route was increasingly changed. After France surrendered to Germany in June 1940 the Port of London became too dangerous, so instead the ship used Liverpool or sometimes Avonmouth or Newport, Wales. From the end of 1940 her voyages home from Australia or New Zealand tended to be eastward via the Pacific Ocean and Panama Canal instead of westward via the Indian Ocean, South Africa and the South Atlantic.

=== Collision at Sydney ===
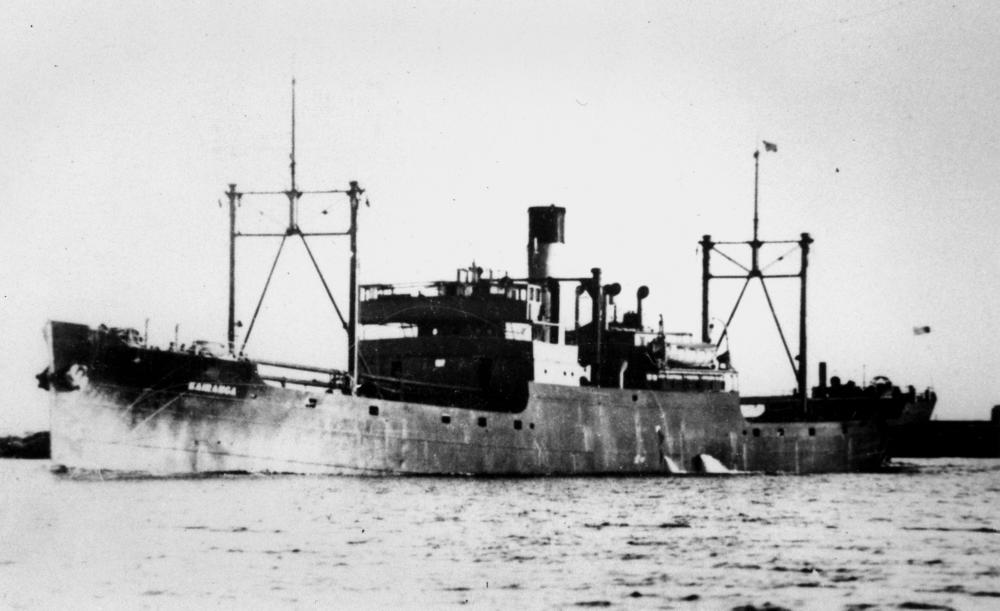
Kairanga, with which Empire Star collided in Sydney Harbour in 1940

At 1107 hrs on 7 March 1940, Empire Star was arriving in Sydney Harbour when she collided almost head on with the Union Steam Ship Co's 2,830 GRT steamship Kairanga. The latter's bow was torn open for 53 feet (16 m) on her port side, her forward topmast was lost and one of her crew was killed. Kairanga saved herself by beaching on Goat Island, and returned to service after repairs lasting three months. Empire Star was also damaged but less seriously, and returned to service on 1 April.

=== Evacuation from Singapore ===
In November 1941 Empire Star left Liverpool as a member of Convoy WS 12Z to Freetown, Sierra Leone. She and another of other members of the convoy continued to Bombay, where they arrived on 6 January. On 8 December Japan had invaded Malaya, and on 19 January Empire Star left Bombay for Singapore as part of Convoy BM 11. By the time the convoy reached Singapore on 29 January Malaya was lost, and only the narrow Straits of Johor lay between Japanese forces and the island of Singapore.

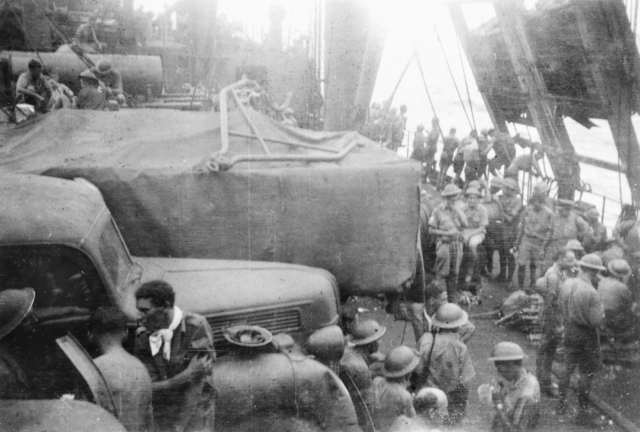
Evacuated troops and RAF equipment from Singapore aboard Empire Star, 12 February 1942

On 8 February the Japanese invasion of Singapore began. Within days a British and Empire defeat was inevitable, and an evacuation of key personnel was begun. By 11 February Empire Star had loaded RAF equipment and stores and had embarked what the Master, Selwyn Capon, estimated were more than 2,160 people. Later he wrote that they included 1,573 RAF, British Army and Royal Navy personnel, 139 Australian Imperial Force personnel and 133 army nurses and signalling personnel. The nurses were members of the Australian Army Nursing Service from two Australian Army Medical Corps hospitals. Many of the signalling personnel, like the nurses, would have been women. The total number of women on the ship was 160 and there were also 35 children.

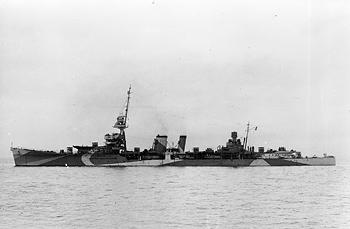
The light cruiser HMS Durban was one of the convoy's escorts from Singapore

In the early hours of 12 February Empire Star and the Ocean Steam Ship Co cargo ship Gorgon left Singapore escorted by the Danae-class cruiser HMS Durban and anti-submarine vessel Kedah, which was a converted Singapore – Penang ferry. At 0910 hrs in the Durian Strait south of Singapore, six Japanese dive-bombers attacked the convoy. Anti-aircraft fire shot down one aircraft and damaged another, which broke off from the attack. Three bombs hit Empire Star, killing 14 people and wounding 17, including her Second Officer and an Able Seaman. She was set afire in three places but her firefighting equipment was not disabled. One of Empire Star's four lifeboats was damaged. In this or a subsequent attack one of the ship's anti-aircraft guns was destroyed.

The Chief Officer Joseph Dawson organised firefighting parties that extinguished all three fires. Australian nurses tended the wounded. As aircraft machine-gunned the ship two nurses, Margaret Anderson and Veronica ("Vera") Torney, threw themselves upon wounded soldiers to protect them from further injury.

At intervals over the next four hours as many as 47 Japanese twin-engined bombers attacked from altitudes of 7,000 to 10,000 feet (2,100 to 3,000 m). The already-damaged lifeboat aboard Empire Star was destroyed, but the ship evaded many more bombs by what was recorded as "violent evasive action". The pilot who had guided Empire Star out of Singapore, Captain George Wright, stayed aboard to be evacuated. He and Empire Star's Third Officer, James Smith, observed aircraft movements and attacks for Captain Capon, enabling the latter to make the right changes of course at the right times to avoid being hit. Near misses exploding in the sea seemed to lift the ship in the water.

On 13 February those killed aboard Empire Star were buried at sea. That same day the ship and her evacuees safely reached Batavia in the Dutch East Indies the next day. She underwent emergency repairs and 48 hours later continued to Fremantle, where she arrived on 23 February. The Australian Red Cross met the ship and distributed clothes and other essentials to the evacuees, as they had brought very little with them.

In September 1942 numerous members of the ship's company were decorated for their part in the operation. Captain Capon, who had already been awarded the OBE for his service in the First World War, was now awarded the CBE. Chief Officer Dawson and Chief Engineer Richard Francis were awarded the OBE. Second Officer James Golightly, Senior Second Engineer Herbert Weller and Third Officer James Smith were awarded the MBE. Boatswain William Power and ship's carpenter Sydney Milne were awarded the BEM. Margaret Anderson was awarded the George Medal and Veronica ("Vera") Torney was awarded the Member of the Order of the British Empire (Military MBE).

Commendations were given to engineers JJ Johnson, J Middleton and JR Mitchell, stewards CE Ribbons and TS Hughes, cadets R Foulkner and R Perry, Able Seaman CP Barber and donkeyman HE Heaver.

The London Gazette records:

The Master's coolness, leadership and skill were outstanding and it was mainly due to his handling of the ship that the vessel reached safety.

The Chief Officer showed great organising ability and tireless leadership throughout. Under the direction of the Chief Engineer, the Engineer Officers remained at their posts throughout the attacks and kept the engines and fire service pumps working, thus releasing all others of the Engine-room staff to help the fire parties. The Second Officer was in charge of the guns and fought them with gallantry throughout the attacks. One aircraft was shot down and one certainly damaged by the combined fire of the ship and her secort.

The Boatswain and the Carpenter behaved magnificently throughout. They led the crew and worked tirelessly during the attacks. They were always prominent, leading fire parties, dealing efficiently with fires and led parties that carried the wounded to hospital.

Empire Star spent 23–27 February in Fremantle and then 4–23 March in Sydney. She crossed the Tasman Sea to New Zealand's North Island, reaching New Plymouth on 27 March and Wellington on 2 April. She headed east across the Pacific, traversed the Panama Canal on 26–28 August and reached Liverpool on 11 September.

== Loss ==
In October 1942 Empire Star loaded a mixed cargo including some ammunition and a deck cargo of aircraft. She embarked 12 British, five South African and two Polish passengers and on 20 October left Liverpool independently and unescorted, bound for Cape Town and East London.

Approximate position of Empire Star's wreck in the North Atlantic

On 23 October Empire Star was making 14 knots (26 km/h) in bad weather and had stopped zig-zagging in order to avoid damage to her deck cargo. About 1500 hrs the Type VIIC German submarine U-615 started following her, and about 40 minutes later fired a spread of four torpedoes at her. At 1543 hrs two of the torpedoes struck the ship's starboard side. The first was a dud but the second detonated amidships, flooding her engine room, killing four crew and stopping her engines and generators. Two men on the engine room control platform were wounded, one of her two starboard lifeboats was destroyed and the ship listed heavily to starboard.

Empire Star transmitted a distress signal and the order was given to abandon ship. The crew launched the remaining three lifeboats and five liferafts. The boats were fitted with skates, which enabled the port ones to be launched despite the heavy list. Despite a heavy sea, all passengers and crew were evacuated except the four killed in the engine room. The three boats then stood off as the ship righted herself and settled low in the water. The First Officer, Leslie Vernon, considered whether to reboard the ship to see if she could be saved.

About 25 minutes after the first explosion U-615 attempted a coup de grâce by firing a torpedo from one of her stern tubes. This missed, so the submarine reloaded her bow tubes and turned to fire again. The next torpedo struck Empire Star between her No. 4 and No. 5 holds about an hour and a half after the first explosion. The ship remained afloat, so U-615 hit her with another coup de grâce. Empire Star's bow rose from the sea and she sank by the stern, and about five minutes later a strong underwater explosion shook the lifeboats. The submarine did not surface to question the survivors.

One lifeboat contained 38 people and was commanded by Captain Capon. Chief Officer Vernon commanded a second, which with difficulty in the heavy sea collected nine survivors from five liferafts. Vernon's boat transferred the Third Officer, Roland Moscrop-Young, to command the third boat, leaving Vernon's boat with 34 people. Moscrop-Young's boat was the least crowded, containing 27 people. Moscrop-Young tried to get it alongside to take some people off Captain Capon's, but was prevented by the heavy sea. Capon ordered the three boats to keep together overnight and then sail for the Azores, which were about 570 miles to the south.

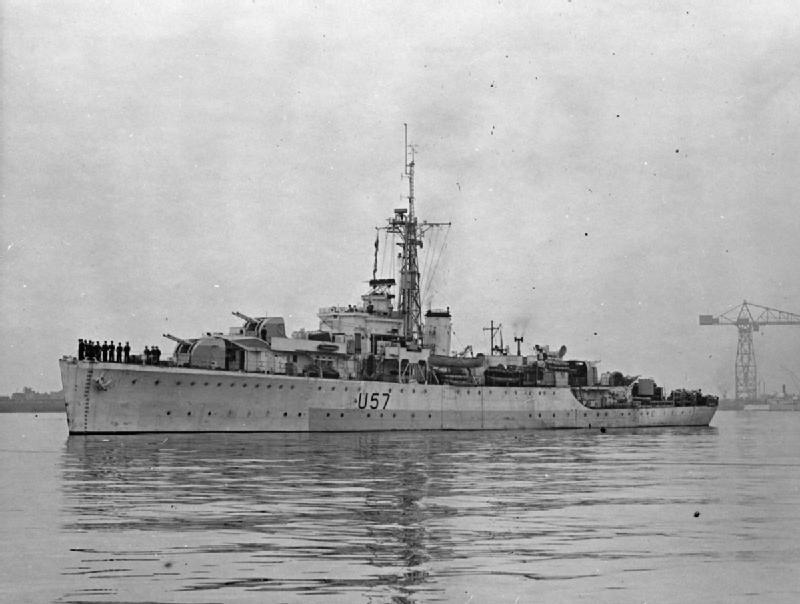
The sloop HMS Black Swan, which rescued Empire Star's 61 survivors

Overnight there was a strong northwest wind and heavy sea, drenching everyone in the boats. At first light on 24 October the boats could not see each other. Vernon's boat hoisted its sail and set off before the wind, until at 1010 hrs his crew sighted the Third Officer's boat several miles to the southwest. They tried to steer towards it, but the heavy weather prevented them. At 1230 hrs Vernon abandoned the attempt and altered course to the southeast. At 1700 hrs he ordered the sail lowered and the boat to heave to with her sea anchor. At 2300 hrs the rudder broke off at the top pintle, so two of Vernon's men used an oar as an improvised and unsatisfactory steering oar. On 25 October the weather was still wild so Vernon's boat drifted before the wind with her sea anchor and sail.

On the afternoon of 25 October the Black Swan-class sloop HMS Black Swan found an upturned lifeboat surrounded by wreckage. Then at 1815 hrs the sloop found Vernon's boat and rescued her 34 occupants. Black Swan then searched for 120 miles, and on the morning of 26 October located Moscop-Young's boat and rescued its 27 occupants. Captain Capon and his party were never found. His may have been the upturned boat that the sloop had seen on the afternoon of 25 October. Capon's boat included the Chief Engineer, all three radio officers and six passengers. Five of the passengers were South African: 63-year-old Julie Martiessen with her 27-year-old daughter Gisela, and 46-year-old Annie Philpott with her two boys Kenneth (12) and John (nine).

Surviving passengers wrote to Blue Star Line commending the ship's officers and men. One credited Leslie Vernon and Second Officer JP Smith with "unflinching courage" and tirelessness. Another commended Vernon for "seamanship, courage and tact". Seaman James Donaldson was called "outstanding" for his "energy and zeal". Roland Moscrop-Young was credited with "remarkable coolness, ability and seamanship" and Junior Engineer Hickman was thanked for "continuous and unending" help. Vernon and Moscrop-Young were awarded the MBE and Donaldson was awarded the BEM.

== Successor ship ==
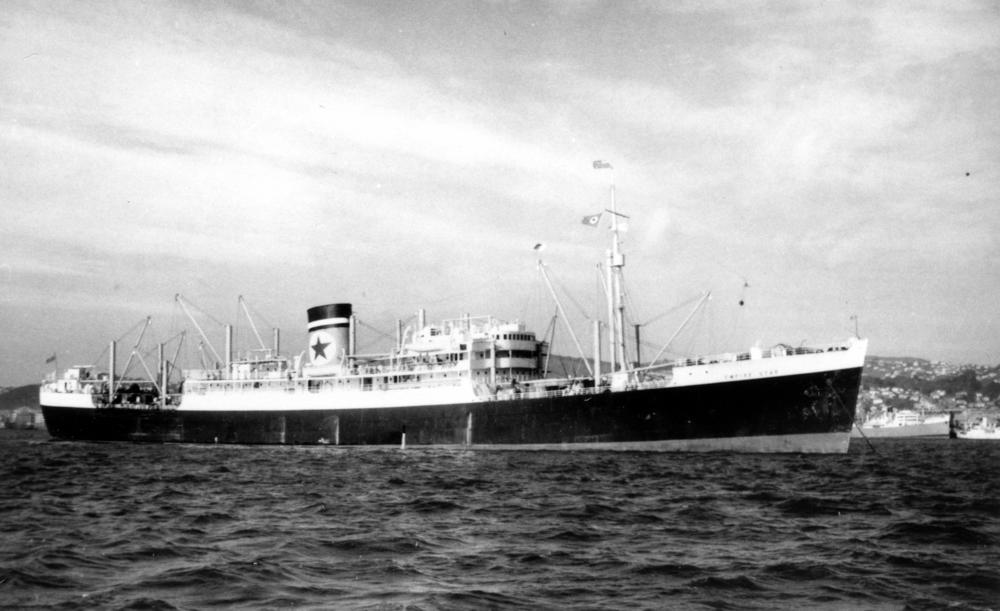
The third Empire Star

After the War, Blue Star Line ordered three more Imperial Star-class ships from Harland and Wolff in Belfast to replace some of its war losses. They included a third Empire Star, which was launched on 4 March 1946 as Empire Mercia for the Ministry of War Transport but completed in December as Empire Star for the Blue Star Line company Frederick Leyland & Co. She was transferred to another Blue Star company, Lamport and Holt Line, in 1950. In 1971 she was sold to Long Jong Industrial Co of Taiwan who scrapped her at Kaohsiung.

== Sources ==
- "Taffrail" (Henry Taprell Dorling) (1973). Blue Star Line at War, 1939–45. London: W. Foulsham & Co. pp. 61–64, 109–113. ISBN 0-572-00849-X.
