= Lyd =

Lyd or LYD may refer to:

- LYD, the abbreviation for a Libyan dinar
- PKP class Lyd2, a diesel hydraulic locomotive
- Lyd (locomotive), a 2010-built narrow-gauge steam locomotive based on a design for the Lynton and Barnstaple Railway
- River Lyd (disambiguation), the name of two rivers in England
- A common diminutive of Lydia
