= Yaohua =

Yaohua may refer to:

== Places ==
- Yaohua Road (Shanghai Metro), an interchange system between Line 7 and Line 8 of the Shanghai Metro
- Yaohua High School, a high school located in Tianjin, China
- Yaohua Experimental School, an independent college preparatory school located in Shenzhen

== People ==
- Xiong Yaohua (1937–1985), birth name of Gu Long, Taiwanese novelist
- Lin Yaohua (1910–2000), Chinese sociologist and anthropologist

== Other uses ==
- MV Yaohua, the original name of a 1967 built passenger ship that now serves a floating tourist attraction in Tianjin, China
