= SS Lydia =

SS Lydia is the name of the following ships:

- SS Lydia (1890), scrapped in 1933
- SS Lydia (1919), ex-USS Lydia (ID-3524)

== See also ==
- Lydia (disambiguation)
