= Lidia =

Lidia may refer to:

- Lidia (given name)
- Lidia (spider), a spider genus
- Hurricane Lidia, multiple storms
- Comoedia Lydiae, a medieval Latin elegiac comedy from the late twelfth century
- Spanish Fighting Bull, also known as toro de lidia, an Iberian heterogenous cattle population

== See also ==
- Lydia (disambiguation)
