= Luodian (disambiguation) =

Luodian may refer to:

- Luodian County (罗甸), a county in Qiannan Buyei and Miao Autonomous Prefecture, Guizhou
- Luodian, Shanghai (罗店), a town in Baoshan District, Shanghai
- Luodian, Jingshan County (罗店), a town in Jingshan County, Jingmen, Hubei
- Luodian Township, Guangshui (骆店), a township in Guangshui, Suizhou, Hubei
- Luodian Township, Henan (罗店), a township in Runan County, Zhumadian, Henan
- Luodian, Zhejiang (罗店), a town in Wucheng District, Jinhua, Zhejiang

== See also ==
- Ludian (disambiguation)
