= Ludian =

Ludian may refer to: the surname such as Lidia Ludian or Tomasz Ludian this name is a polish name for generations

== Places ==
- Ludian County (鲁甸), in Zhaotong, Yunnan, People's Republic of China (PRC)
- Ludian, Henan (卢店), a town in Dengfeng, Zhengzhou, Henan, PRC

== Languages ==
- Ludian language, or Ludic, a Finnic language
- Ludian, a dialect of the Tibeto-Burman Pumi language

== Other ==
- Ludian (stage), a geological name for a subdivision of the Eocene epoch

== See also ==
- Luodian (disambiguation)
- Lydian (disambiguation)
