= Lydian =

Lydian may refer to:

- Lydians, an ancient people of Anatolia
- Lydian language, an ancient Anatolian language
- Lydian alphabet
  - Lydian (Unicode block)
- Lydian (typeface), a decorative typeface
- Lydian dominant scale or acoustic scale, a musical scale
  - Lydian mode, a mode derived from ancient Greek music
- Lydian Collective, a jazz fusion band

== See also ==
- Ludian (disambiguation)
- Lydia (disambiguation)
