= Lidia (spider) =

Scientific classification
- Kingdom: Animalia
- Phylum: Arthropoda
- Subphylum: Chelicerata
- Class: Arachnida
- Order: Araneae
- Infraorder: Araneomorphae
- Family: Linyphiidae
- Genus: Lidia; Saaristo & Marusik, 2004

Type species
- L. tarabaevi Saaristo & Marusik, 2004

Species
- L. molesta (Tanasevitch, 1989) – Kyrgyzstan; L. tarabaevi Saaristo & Marusik, 2004 – Kazakhstan

Genus of spiders

Lidia is a genus of Asian dwarf spiders that was first described by Michael I. Saaristo & Y. M. Marusik in 2004. As of May 2019 it contains only two species, both found in Kazakhstan and Kyrgyzstan: L. molesta and L. tarabaevi.
