= River Lyd =

River Lyd may refer to:

- River Lyd (Gloucestershire), a tributary that flows into the River Severn at Lydney, England
- River Lyd (Devon), a river in Dartmoor, Devon, England
