= MV Brazil Maru =

Retired Japanese cargo liner

Coordinates: 21.216389°N 110.420361°E

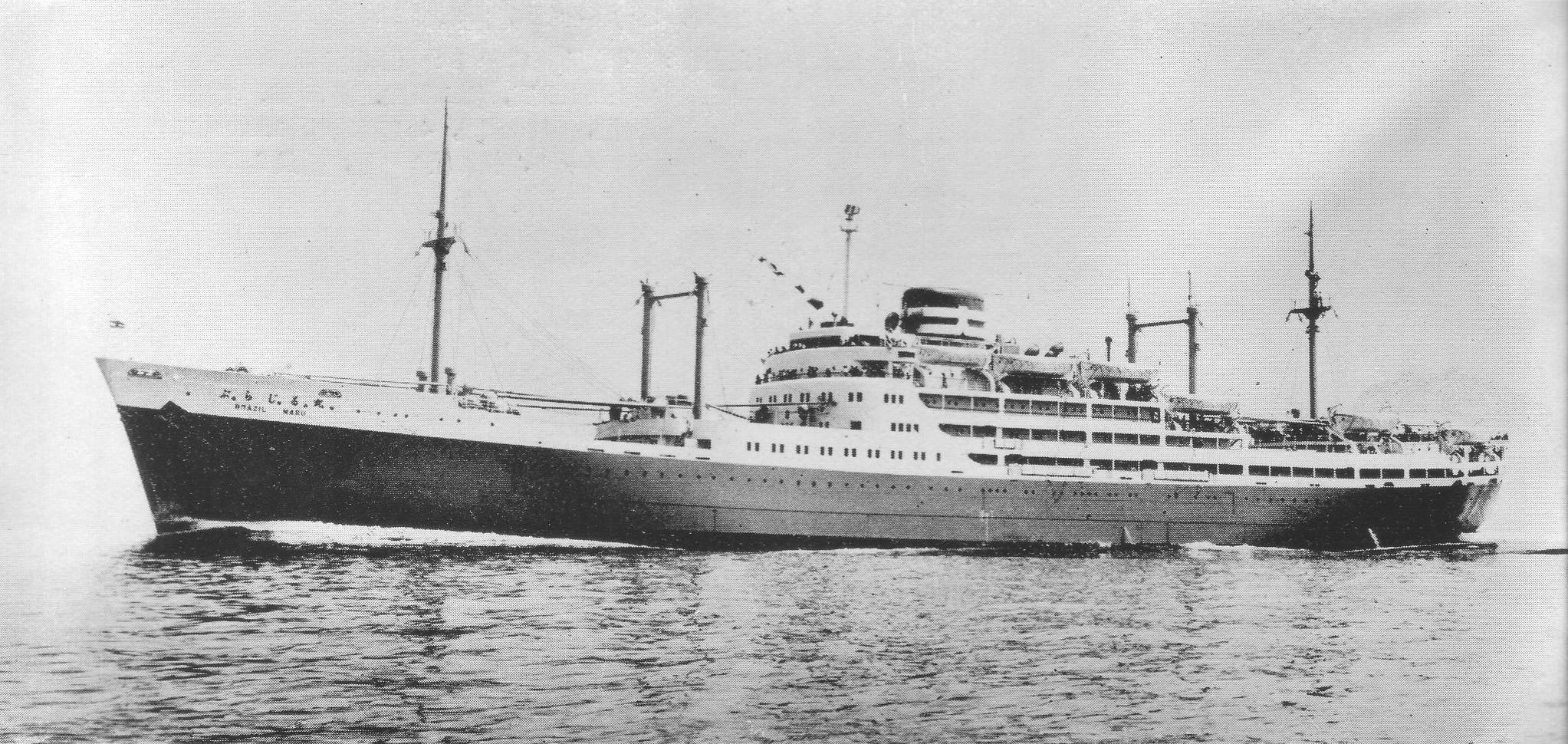
- Brazil Maru at sea in 1955

History

Japan
- Name: 1954–1974: Brazil Maru; 1974–1997: Toba Brazil Maru; 1997–1998: Zhanjiang; 1998–present: Hai Shang Cheng Shi
- Namesake: Brazil (1954-1997); Zhanjiang (1997-1998)
- Owner: 1954–1963: Osaka Shosen KK; 1963–1970: Nihon Ijusen KK; 1970–1996: Mitsui O.S.K. Lines; 1996-1997: undisclosed shipbreakers; 1997-present: Zhanjiang Maritime City Tourism and Entertainment
- Operator: 1974-1996: Toba Brazil Maru Tourist Company
- Route: Kobe to Buenos Aires
- Builder: Shin Mitsubishi Heavy Industries Kobe Shipyard, Kobe, Japan
- Yard number: 858
- Laid down: 27 October 1953
- Launched: 6 April 1954
- Completed: 10 July 1954
- Acquired: 10 July 1954
- Maiden voyage: 30 July 1954
- In service: 1954
- Out of service: February 1974
- Identification: IMO number: 5050866; Radio callsign: JDHB
- Fate: Undergoing restoration into tourist attraction
- Status: Beached, Zhanjiang

General characteristics
- Type: Cargo liner
- Tonnage: 10,100 GRT; 9,882 DWT; 5,946.4 NT; 10,216.6 GRT (1965 rebuild)
- Length: 511.8 ft (156.0 m) LOA; 475.7 ft (145.0 m) LBP
- Beam: 19.60 m (64.3 ft)
- Depth: 11.90 m (39.0 ft)
- Installed power: 1 Shin-Mitsubishi Kobe Sulzer 10RSD76 diesel engine
- Propulsion: single screw, 9,000 bhp (6,700 kW)
- Speed: 16.25 knots (30.10 km/h; 18.70 mph); 20.312 knots (37.618 km/h; 23.375 mph) (maximum speed)
- Capacity: 982 passengers: 12 first class, 68 second class, 902 third class; 360 passengers: 12 cabin class, 348 economy class (1965 rebuild)
- Crew: 118

MV Brazil Maru is a retired Japanese cargo liner that sailed for the Japanese shipping company, Osaka Shosen KK, on the Japan to South America immigrant service from 1954 to 1963.

Built by the Shin Mitsubishi Heavy Industries Kobe Shipyard in Kobe, Japan, she departed on her maiden voyage on the 30 July 1954. She was transferred to Nihon Ijusen KK in 1963 and later Mitsui O.S.K. Lines in 1970. After a decline in the immigrant trade and a period as an unsuccessful cruise ship. The Brazil Maru was retired in 1974 and moored as a maritime tourist attraction named Toba Brazil Maru in Toba, Mie Prefecture, Japan, but was closed and sold to ship breakers at Shanghai in 1996. Sold again in 1997 and beached as a tourist attraction and hotel Hai Shang Cheng Shi (City on the Water) in Zhanjiang, Guangdong Province, China in 1998, the vessel remains there today but has since closed.

== Construction ==
After the Second World War, Osaka Shosen KK resumed its South American service under permission granted by the SCAP. With growing Japanese demand for emigration to Brazil and Argentina, South America emigration was reinstated as a national policy following the San Francisco Peace Treaty of 1952, and Osaka Shosen KK subsequently converted three cargo ships into cargo-passenger ships with the addition of third-class cabins that were hastily added. Seeking more tonnage on the immigrant-run in service of the Japanese community in Brazil, Osaka Shosen KK decided to build the Brazil Maru as a replacement for the 1939 vessel of the same name.

Her construction contract was signed on 10 October 1953, and the Brazil Maru was laid down on 27 October 1953 at the Shin-Mitsubishi Heavy Industries Kobe Shipyard. She was launched on 6 April 1954, and completed on the 10th of July, being delivered to her owners that same day. She was powered by the first of the newly in production Shin-Mitsubishi Kobe Sulzer 10RSD76 diesel engine, which was developed by the shipyard, and provided a total of 9,000 brake horsepower to one propeller. She had a bale capacity of 402,587.2 cubic feet (11,400.00 m^{3}), and weighed 10,100 GRT.

== Immigrant-run and cruising ==
Twenty days after completion, the Brazil Maru departed on her maiden voyage from Kobe on 30 July 1954. Her maiden complement consisted of 603 emigrants to Brazil and 293 other passengers on board, with the 44-day voyage including stops at Nagoya, Yokohama, Los Angeles, Cristobal, La Guaira, Belem, Recife, Rio de Janeiro, Santos, Montevideo, and Buenos Aires. The Brazil Marus normal route took about fifty days, with her dormitories converted to cargo space on return voyages.

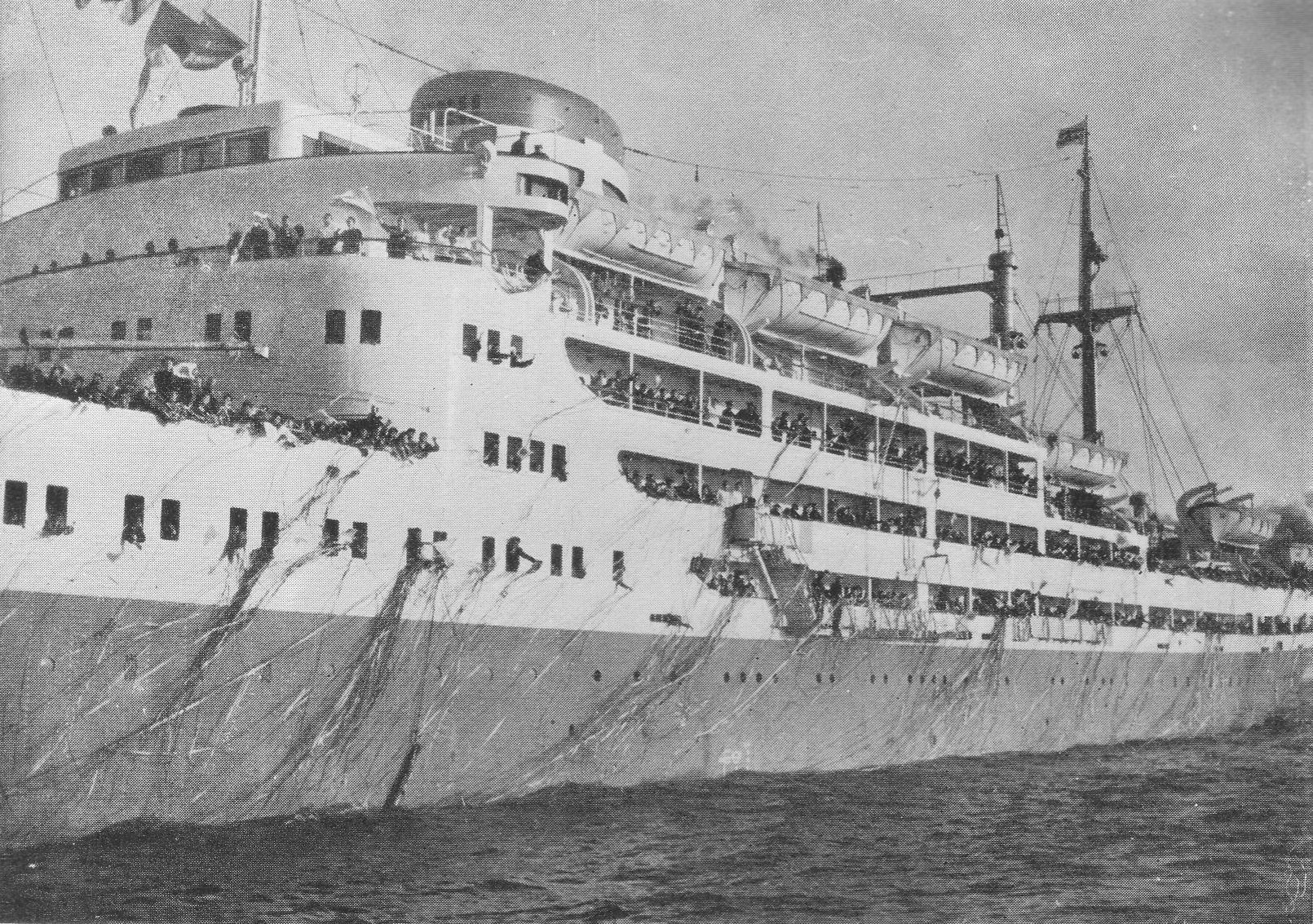
Brazil Maru covered in ribbons during departure from a port

Though stagnant emigrant rates led to the construction of a sister ship to the Brazil Maru being temporarily shelved, economic success would see the 10,983 ton Argentina Maru built in 1958. Like the Brazil Maru, she was a replacement of a previous liner of the same name. The Brazil Maru, Argentina Maru, and later 12,628 ton liner Sakura Maru alternated their sailings so that they departed outbound and homebound every one to two months.

The emergence of the Japanese economic miracle in the 1950s led to a decrease in Japanese immigration to South America, with the peak of immigration having passed in 1960. In 1963, the Brazil Maru was transferred to Nihon Ijusen KK and bareboat chartered back to Osaka Shosen KK. During this time the Brazil Maru increasingly exported Japanese electronics outbound, carrying raw materials and meat on the homebound voyage. Further declines in immigration from Japan in the 1960s led to the number of emigrants traveling aboard the Brazil Maru to fall below 1,000 per year, and the Brazil Maru was subsequently refitted at the Shin-Mitsubishi Heavy Industries Kobe Shipyard to reduce passenger capacity by half in August 1965, intending to operate her on the tourist trade as cruise ship. Conversion work included the installation of air-conditioning and a swimming pool, with dormitories converted to four, six, or eight berth cabins. Both cabin and economy class featured their own dining room and smoking rooms. as well as a lounge. Following her conversion, the Brazil Maru was registered at 10,216.6 GRT, and now only operated on the immigrant-run three times a year, resuming service on 30 October. The Brazil Maru would serve in competition against transpacific cruise liners of American President Lines and P&O-Orient Lines, and Japan-South America liners of Royal Interocean Line.

In 1970, the Brazil Maru was registered to Mitsui O.S.K. Lines, with the rise of Transpacific commercial air travel eventually leading to her shifting entirely towards cruises from Japan to Shanghai. Low revenue led to her quickly being withdrawn from service and laid up 6 March or September 1973, operating one last cruise to Shanghai in September before being withdrawn permanently from service in February 1974. Over 20 years, the Brazil Maru had made a total of 58 long-distance voyages, including 55 voyages to South America and three special voyages to Australia, transporting about 67,000 passengers on the South American route, of which 16,204 were immigrants.

== Retirement and conversion ==
With the ships incoming retirement, plans were devised for her future, with the city of Toba establishing the "Special Committee for the Promotion of the Brazil Maru" to begin its advertising campaign for the vessels future role. After being retired, the Brazil Maru was renamed the Toba Brazil Maru and refitted at her original builders, the Shin Mitsubishi Heavy Industries Kobe Shipyard, for use as a maritime tourist attraction moored in Ise Bay off Toba, Mie Prefecture, Japan. The Toba Brazil Maru opened on 1 July 1974, though officially opened on 5 July. She was operated by the Toba Brazil Maru Tourist Company, which was formed on 23 January 1974 (Note: Kludas states she was sold to the Toba Brazil Maru Tourist Company (labelled as Toba Brazil Maru KK) in 1973 after her final cruise.) and financed by Mitsui O.S.K. Lines, as well as the Toba City Development Public Corporation, Kintetsu Railway, Ataka Sangyo Co., Ltd., and other Mitsui Group companies.

The Toba Brazil Maru featured new exhibition rooms such as the "Marine Corner", which included models of ancient ships, and the "Brazil Corner", which showed the nature and culture of Brazil through videos and panels, as well as amenities such as a restaurant, a game corner, and a shopping corner. Her wheelhouse and engine room had been preserved as in service. Kids playground equipment designed to look like the character of Lemuel Gulliver from Irish writer Jonathan Swifts book Gulliver's Travels was installed on the ship sometime after February 1976, but was removed and relocated to the Shimin no Mori Park in Toba in 1985. When opened, she was initially painted in the livery of her previous operator Mitsui O.S.K. Lines, but her hull was later repainted white.

Despite high visitation, primarily through student field trips, poor business following the burst of the Japanese asset price bubble led to the Toba Brazil Maru being closed on 30 January 1996. A farewell party for the ship was held on board on 20 January, and was attended by approximately 60 people either associated with or fans of the ship. Her last three days of operation were free for visitors, with 9,000 visitors in total. In her twenty two years open as Toba Brazil Maru, she attracted a total of about 10 million visitors. After closure, the ship was used as an office to liquidate the Toba Brazil Maru Tourist Company. She was sold to breakers in Shanghai for dismantling in February 1996, and departed Toba for Shanghai on 29 May.

The Toba Brazil Maru was purchased in 1997 by Zhang Huasheng, chairman of Zhanjiang Maritime City Tourism and Entertainment, a company based in Zhanjiang, Guangdong Province, China. Renamed Zhanjiang, she was beached in Zhanjiang in 1998 for continued preservation, and used as a floating tourist attraction and hotel called Hai Shang Cheng Shi (City on the Water). Modified to house new facilities and restaurants, her exterior and wheelhouse were left largely intact. While remaining open, poor management and lack of maintenance would lead to the ships dilapidation, with photos taken in 2012 showing the Hai Shang Cheng Shi with damaged lifeboats and heavy rusting. She was seen undergoing maintenance in 2018, and by then had new additions added to her superstructure. In 2020, the Hai Shang Cheng Shi was used as a set in the Chinese television series The Bad Kids. By 2022, the Hai Shang Cheng Shi was reportedly closed and can be seen via satellite in Zhanjiang as of 2024.

In August 2025, it was announced that the Hai Shang Cheng Shi was undergoing a 100 million yuan renovation to reopen as part of a greater effort to revitalize Zhanjiang's historical and cultural tourist areas. The plan calls for the reinforcement and righting of the vessel alongside external and internal rebuilds and redecoration with the construction of a new boarding bridge and 3,500 square meter "permeable facility" in front of the ship. Concurrent with preliminary work, the first phase of upgrades was reportedly launched on 1 August 2025.
