= Lydia (disambiguation) =

Lydia was an Iron Age kingdom of western Asia Minor.

Lydia may also refer to:

== Arts and entertainment ==
=== Music ===
- Lydia (band), an indie rock band
- Lydia (singer), Spanish pop singer Lydia Rodríguez Fernández (born 1980)
- Lydia, a 1974 album by Cold Blood
- "Lydia" (Fur Patrol song), 2000
- "Lydia" (Highly Suspect song), 2015
- "Lydia", a 1978 song by Dean Friedman
- "Lydia", a song from the 1979 album Back in Your Life by Jonathan Richman
- "Lydia", a song from the 2004 album F.I.R. by F.I.R.
- "Lydia", an 1871 composition by Gabriel Fauré
- "Lydia the Tattooed Lady," a 1939 signature tune of Groucho Marx

=== Other arts and entertainment ===
- Lydia (painting), a 1777 painting by William Peters
- Lydia (film), a 1941 drama starring Merle Oberon
- Lydia (play), a 2008 play by Octavio Solis
- HMS Lydia, a fictional ship commanded by Horatio Hornblower in The Happy Return, a novel by C.S. Forester

== People and fictional characters ==
- Lydia (name), a list of people and fictional characters with the given name
- Giota Lydia (born 1934), Greek Laiko singer
- Lydia of Thyatira, a woman mentioned in the New Testament in Acts 16

== Biology ==
- Lydia, a genus of crabs

== Places ==
=== United States ===
- Lydia, Kansas, an unincorporated community
- Lydia, Louisiana, an unincorporated community and census-designated place
- Lydia, Minnesota, an unincorporated community
- Lydia, South Carolina, an unincorporated community and census-designated place
- Lydia, Virginia, an unincorporated community

=== Elsewhere ===
- Lydia (satrapy), an administrative province of the ancient Achaemenid Empire
- Lydia Mountain, British Columbia, Canada
- Mount Lydia, New Zealand
- 110 Lydia, an asteroid

== Ships ==
- Lydia (whaling bark), a wrecked ship beneath King Street in San Francisco, California, US
- MV Moonta, an Australian coastal passenger ship renamed Lydia in 1955 and Le Lydia in 1967
- USS Lydia (SP-62), a patrol vessel in commission from 1917 to 1919
- USS Lydia (ID-3524), a cargo ship in commission from 1918 to 1919

== See also ==
- Lidia (disambiguation)
- Lydian (disambiguation)
