= MV Orient Princess =

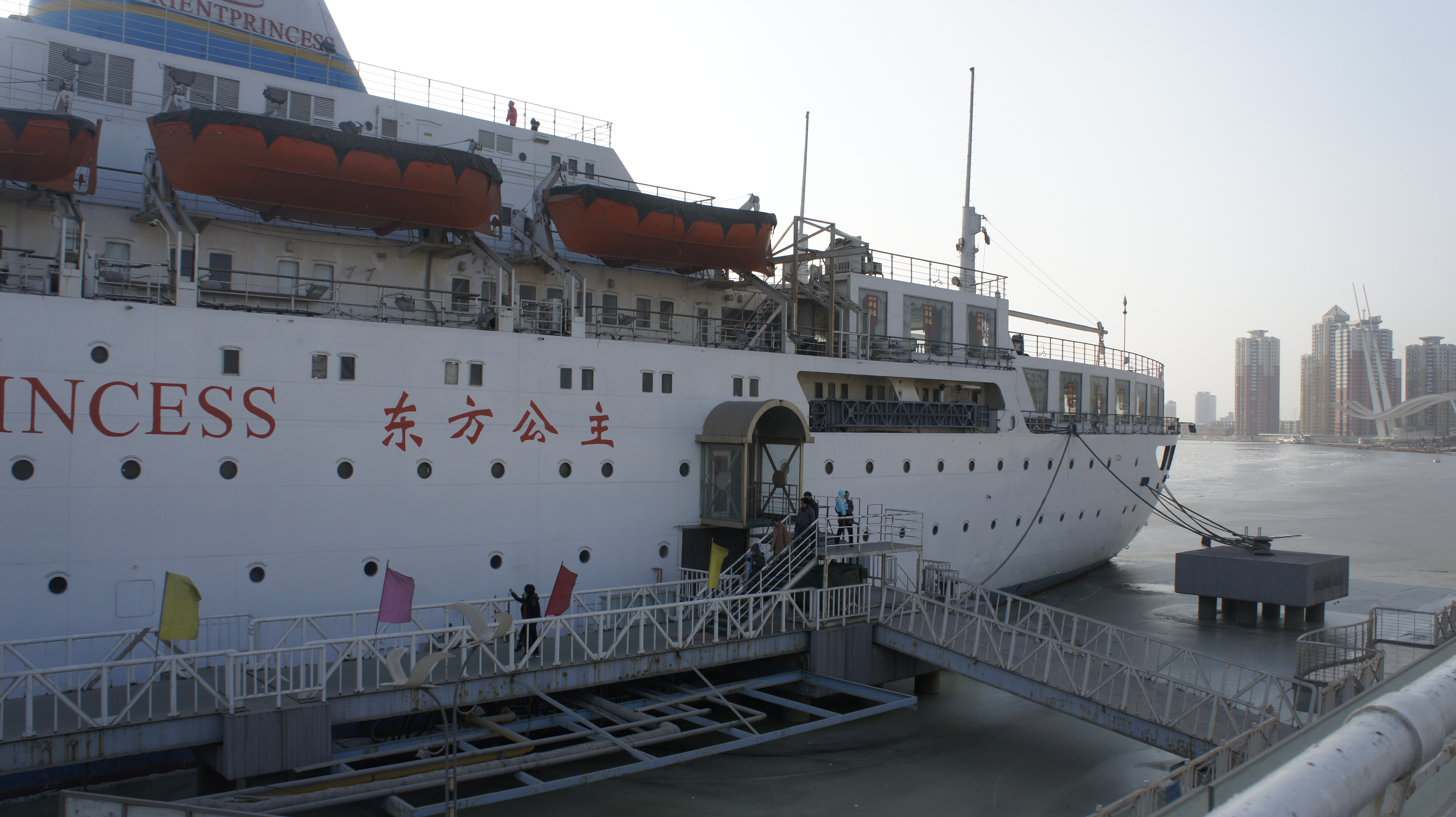
- The Orient Princess at sea.

History
- Name: 1967-1987: Yaohua; 1987-Present: Orient Princess
- Operator: 1967-1982: People’s Republic of China; 1982-1987: Salén Lindblad Cruises; 1987-1994: Republic of China Maritime Corporation; 1994-unknown: Asphonel Services; unknown-circa. 2003: Pallister Group Ltd; 2003-Present: Unknown
- Port of registry: Tianjin, China
- Builder: Chantiers de l'Atlantique, Saint-Nazaire, France
- Yard number: No. 23
- Launched: December 10, 1966
- Acquired: August 20, 1967
- Out of service: April 11, 2003
- Identification: IMO number: 6708109
- Notes: Yao Hua means to "To Glorify China" in the Chinese language.

General characteristics
- Tonnage: 10,151 gross register tons (GRT)
- Length: 488 ft (149 m)
- Beam: 68.9 ft (21.0 m)
- Speed: 19–20 knots (35–37 km/h; 22–23 mph)
- Capacity: As built: 100 (first class); 100 (second class); 118 (third class)
- Crew: 177 (maximum)

The MV Orient Princess (Chinese: 东方公主号) is a 1967 built passenger ship, originally built as the Yaohua. She was the first purpose built passenger ship for the People’s Republic of China, as well as their first flagship.

== History ==
Orient Princess was delivered as Yaohua to the China Ocean Shipping Company, who had her first operate from China to East Africa. She would later sail in the Far East. Yaohua had a larger swimming pool then most ships of her size.

In 1982 the vessel was chartered to Salén Lindblad Cruises, a move that allowed the ship to become more popular. Salén Lindblad operated her under the name China Cruises beginning in March 1983, having her cruise through the Yangtze River and along the Chinese coast. These cruises would begin in either Beijing or Hong Kong. In 1987 she was purchased and renamed Orient Princess. Throughout the 1990s the Orient Princess would change ownership and roles several times, once operating as a casino ship.

== Current situation ==
Orient Princess was seized by authorities in April 2003 due to her underpaid crew. She was taken over by another Chinese company, who moored her in Tianjin as a floating tourist attraction. Two large restaurants were built atop Orient Princess, one being placed aft of the boat deck superstructure, the other on her promenade deck. As of 2010 not much else is known of the ship's current status. The ship can currently be seen via satellite on the North Bank of the Haihe River

In 18 November 2024, the deck of Orient Princess has caught fire during its maintenance.
