= MV Moonta =

Australian coastal passenger ship

Coordinates: 42°49′38.92″N 3°2′28.34″E

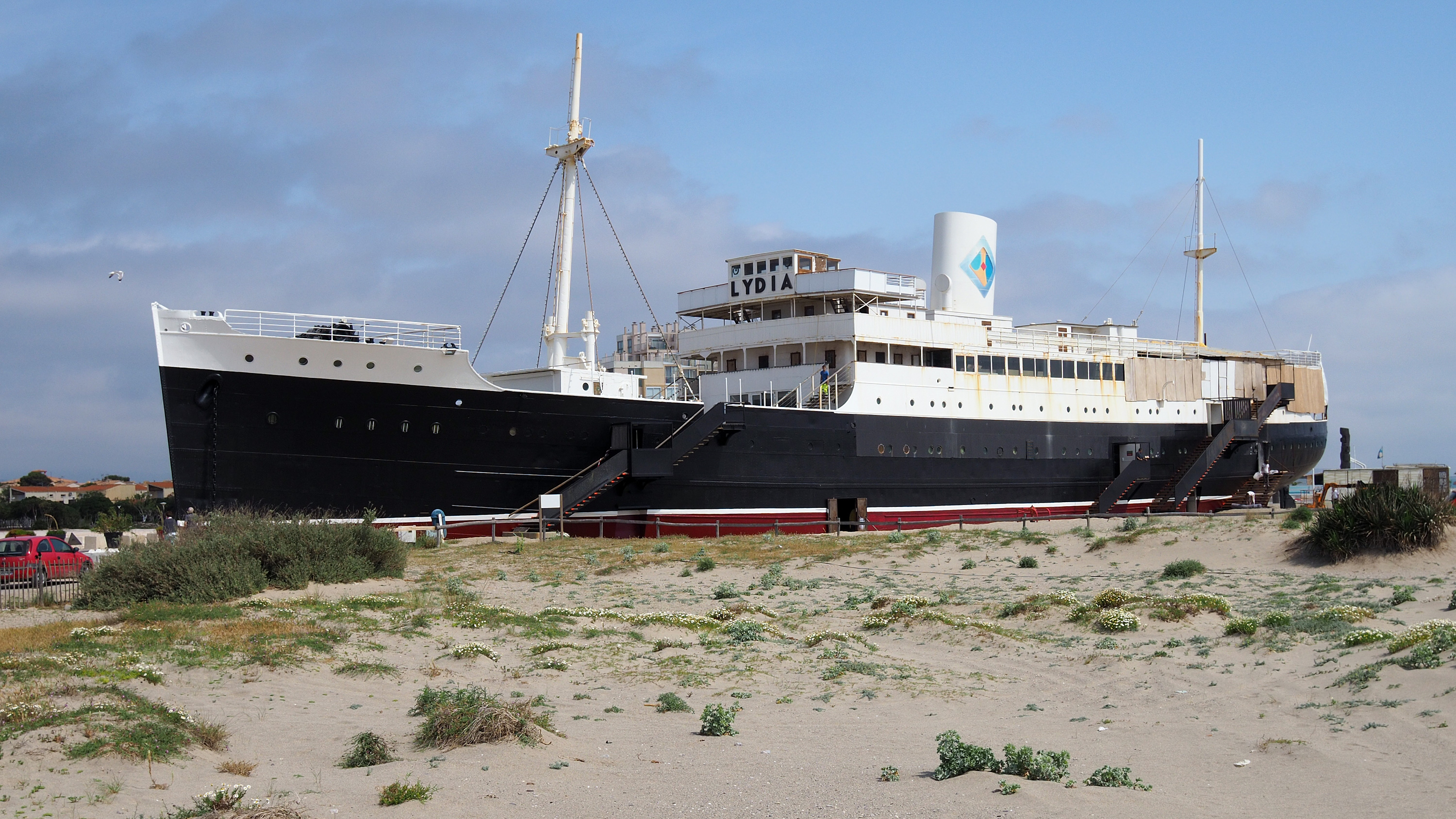
- Casino Le Lydia in 2019

History
- Name: 1931–1955: Moonta; 1955–1966: Lydia; 1967–present: Le Lydia "The sand liner"
- Operator: 1931–1955: Adelaide Steamship Company; 1955–1966: Hellenic Mediterranean lines; 1967–1974: SEMETA; 1974–1988: Seibu Japanese Group; 1988–1997: Alain Ferrand; 2000–2010: groupe partouche; 2010–present: le barcarès
- Builder: Burmeister & Wain
- Launched: 26 June 1931
- Completed: 21 November 1931
- In service: 1931
- Out of service: 1967
- Fate: Hulked and beached 1967

General characteristics
- Tonnage: 2,693 gross register tons (GRT)
- Length: 298 feet
- Beam: 44 feet
- Draught: 15.10 feet
- Propulsion: B&W diesels
- Speed: 12.5 knots
- Capacity: 155 passengers

MV Moonta is a historical retired Australian coastal passenger ship that operated primarily in the Spencer Gulf from 1931 to 1955 for the Adelaide Steamship Company. She is currently a landlocked casino ship and tourist attraction in Le Barcarès, France. She was built in 1931, by Burmeister & Wain in Copenhagen, Denmark.

== Service years ==
Moonta was launched in June 1931 Burmeister & Wain shipyard in Copenhagen, Denmark for the Adelaide Steamship Company. It was reported in March 1931, Amalgamated Wireless was building a modern wireless system for the ship. An aspect of the system was to be a "Gigantaforte for relaying gramophone music throughout the ship by means of three loud speakers.” In October 1931, Moonta departed from Copenhagen en route for Port Adelaide, and was expected to arrive by 23 November. After a brief stop in England, she continued on to Australia with an expected arrival date of 21 November.

The Moonta was designed for the Spencer Gulf route departing from Port Adelaide. She left on her maiden voyage Saturday, 28 November, 1931. The public were invited aboard to inspect the new ship on Tuesday, 24 November.

She started service with a six-day itinerary, disembarking in Adelaide and ending in Port Lincoln, usually with four or five calls along the way. Moonta became well known and beloved for her excellent service and relaxing voyages, being called the perfect "romantic holiday" ship.

On 3 February 1955, the Moonta began to sit idle while the Adelaide Steamship company decided what to do with the aging vessel. Adelaide thought to put the ship up for sale, but instead decided she would be moved to the drydocked and overhauled for the Bass Strait run. She was put on that route in July 1955 until November when she was sold off without any ceremony.

After serving in World War II Moonta continued her Australian coastal service until 1955, when Moonta was sold to the Greek Hellenic Mediterranean Lines for cruising. With this her new owners doubled her passenger capacity and renamed her Lydia. She remained in Greek cruise service until 1966, when Hellenic Mediterranean laid her up.

== Leisure complex service ==
In 1967 SEMETA, a company based in the French resort towns of Leucate and Barcarès bought Lydia to be the maritime symbol of a new innovative hotel opening that year. The new Casino Le Lydia was taken to Marseille, where her propellers and engines were removed. The ship was then landlocked onto a beach in Le Barcarès, the first building in a planned tourism complex. In 1974 a Japanese company bought Casino Le Lydia and added several new features to her. In 1997 the ship ran into trouble when the government closed her down due to new Safety of Life at Sea regulations that came out that year, even though Casino Le Lydia was now considered a building. After lying derelict for three years the Partouche Group bought and restored the ship. As of 2005 complex's features include a casino, restaurant, bar, discotheque, a pool with a waterslide, spa, as well as an exhibition center.

== See also ==
- RMS Queen Mary - Former ocean liner turned hotel in Long Beach, California
- Queen Elizabeth 2 - Former ocean liner turned hotel in Dubai
