= Espagne =

Espagne may refer to:

- French for Spain.
- Cinsaut, a wine grape
- A number of steamships were named Espagne, including -
  - SS Espagne (1891), 3,951 GRT, a French cargo ship
  - SS Espagne (Anversois, 1909), 1,463 GRT, a Belgian cargo ship torpedoed and sunk in 1917
  - SS Espagne (Provence, 1909), 11,155 GRT, a French ocean liner scrapped in 1934
  - SS Espagne (1911), 1,759 GRT, a Belgian cargo ship.
  - SS Espagne (1927), 3,952 GRT, a French refrigerated cargo ship
