= SS Venezuela =

A number of steamships have been named Venezuela, including:

- SS Venezuela (1904)
- SS Venezuela (1905), a French cargo liner wrecked in 1920
- SS Venezuela (1924)
