= Compagnie Générale Transatlantique =

French shipping company

- Industry: Shipping
- Founded: 1861; 165 years ago
- Founder: Pereire brothers
- Defunct: 1976
- Fate: Merged with Compagnie des Messageries Maritimes to form the Compagnie Générale Maritime
- Successor: CMA CGM
- Headquarters: Paris, France
- Key people: Pereire brothers Jules Charles-Roux; John Dal Piaz; Henri Cangardel; Jean Marie; Edmond Lanier

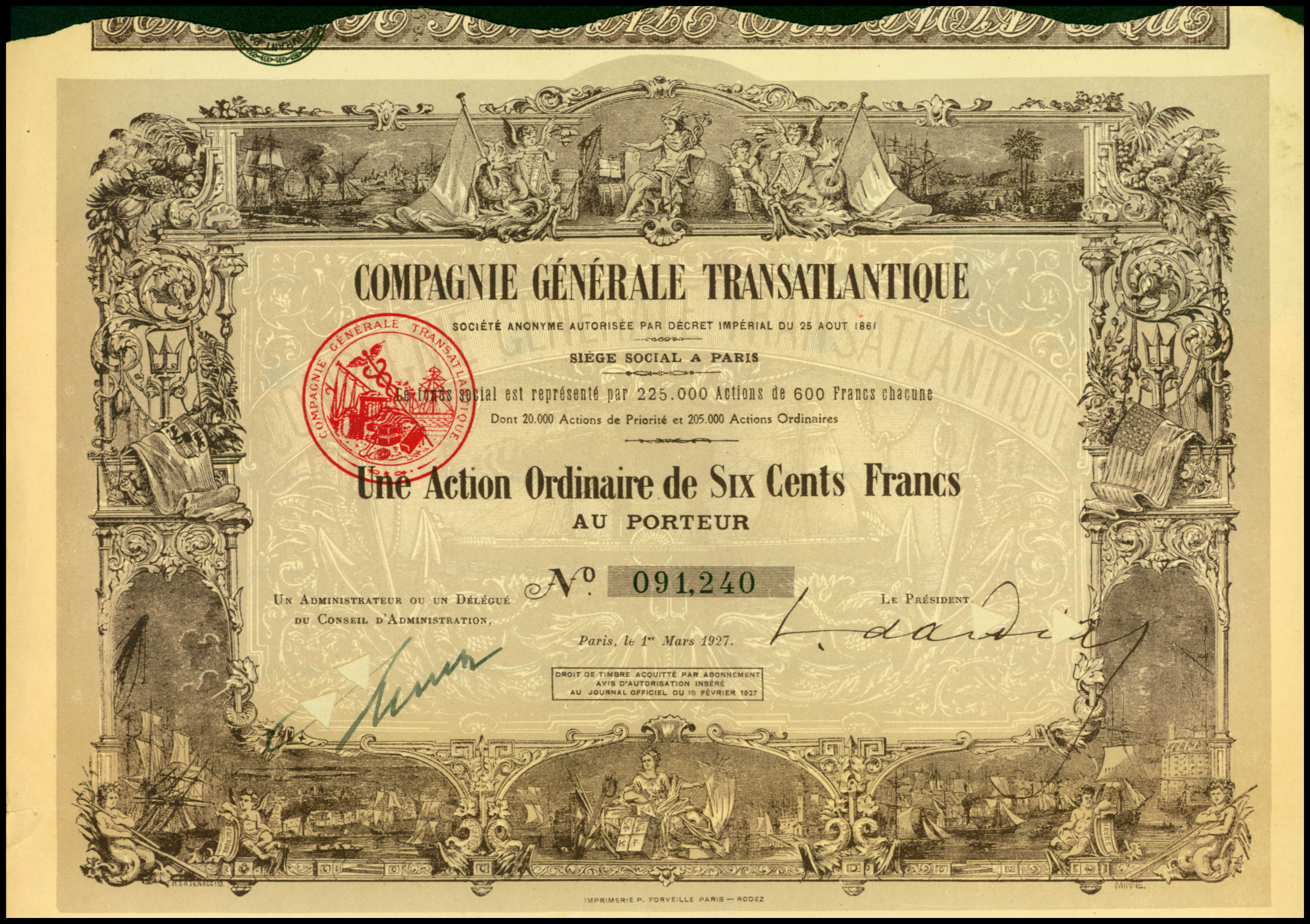
Share of the Compagnie Générale Transatlantique, issued 1. March 1927

The Compagnie Générale Transatlantique (CGT, and commonly named "Transat"), typically known overseas as the French Line, was a French shipping company. Established in 1855 by the brothers Émile and Issac Pereire under the name Compagnie Générale Maritime, the company was entrusted by the French government to transport mail to North America. In 1861, the name of the company was changed to Compagnie Générale Transatlantique. The company's first ship, SS Washington, had its maiden voyage on 15 June 1864. After a period of trial and error in the late 19th century, the company, under the direction of its presidents Jules Charles-Roux and John Dal Piaz, gained fame in the 1910s and 1930s with its famous ocean liners such as SS Paris, SS Île de France, and especially SS Normandie. Weakened by World War II, the company regained its fame in 1962 with the famous SS France, but the ship suffered major competition from air transport and was retired from service in 1974. In 1977, the company merged with the Compagnie des Messageries Maritimes to form the Compagnie Générale Maritime (CGM). Then, in 1996, the company and the Compagnie Maritime d'Affrètement (CMA) merged to form the CMA CGM.

Contrary to what its name suggests, the company did not operate only on the North Atlantic route. It also offered service to Central America and even, for a time, the Pacific coast. From the beginning of the 20th century, it offered crossings between Marseille and Algiers, creating a tourist circuit in North Africa in the 1920s. In the 1930s, the company briefly became involved in aviation through Air France Translatlantique. Other than operating ocean liners, the company also had a significant fleet of cargo ships. The cargo service was started in the 1900s.

The ocean liners of CGT were often symbolic works of art of their time; they were intended to represent an image of France abroad. The quality of services aboard, such as that of meals and wines, had attracted wealthy clientele, including Americans at the time of the Prohibition in the United States. Years after the company's demise, its heritage continues to attract collectors and is showcased in exhibitions.

== History ==
=== Founding and first trials and errors (1855–1861) ===
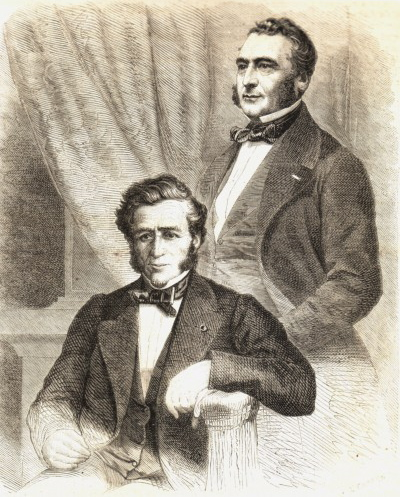
The brothers Émile and Isaac Pereire, founders of the company

In 1855, the Pereire brothers, Émile and Isaac, founded the Compagnie Générale Maritime in Granville, Manche. Already owners of many railway companies, they were a part of a current of French industrialists who founded large companies under the leadership of Napoleon III. In the 1850s, there was a strong need for a French merchant fleet. The Pereires were also at the head of a credit organization, Société Générale de Crédit Mobilier, which became the main shareholder of the new company.

The Compagnie Générale Maritime was thus officially founded on February 24, 1855, and Adolphe d'Eichthal became its first president until 1861. The company was founded upon the takeover of the “Terreneuvienne”, a cod fishing company founded two years previously which owned many sailboats. The first years of the company were disorganized: the shipping routes multiplied in an anarchic way, using up a great part of the company's initial capital.

After this near-bankruptcy, the Pereires understood that, like the Cunard Line, they would be better off focusing on an ocean liner service financed by postal agreements. Napoleon III, seduced by the concept, proposed a number of agreements at the time, which the Pereires refused, judging them to be too weak. The route to the Americas was thus given to Louis Victor Marziou instead, but he was unable to develop it due to a lack of investors in 1860. It was at this moment that Isaac Pereire chose to renegotiate an agreement with the French government. In 1860, they signed an agreement in which the company contracted to create a fleet and to provide liner service and carry mail for 20 years on the following routes: Le Havre – New York with calls at Brest, Saint-Nazaire, and the Isthmus of Panama, with three additional services for Guadeloupe, Cayenne, and Mexico. In return, the government would provide the company with an annual subsidy. In 1861, an imperial decree changed the company's name to Compagnie Générale Transatlantique, to better correspond to its new roles.

=== The difficult start of postal service (1861–1880) ===
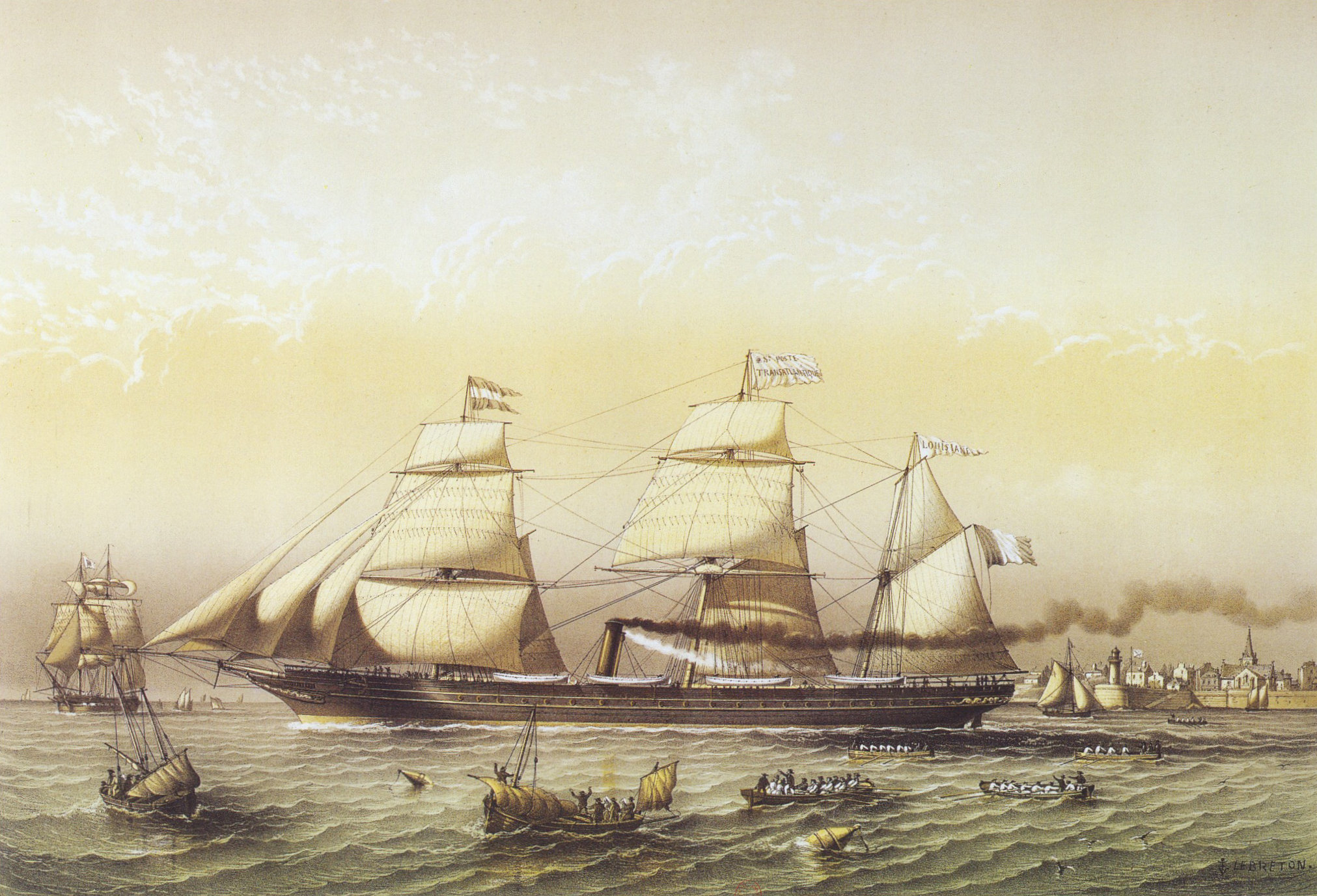
Louisiane of 1862

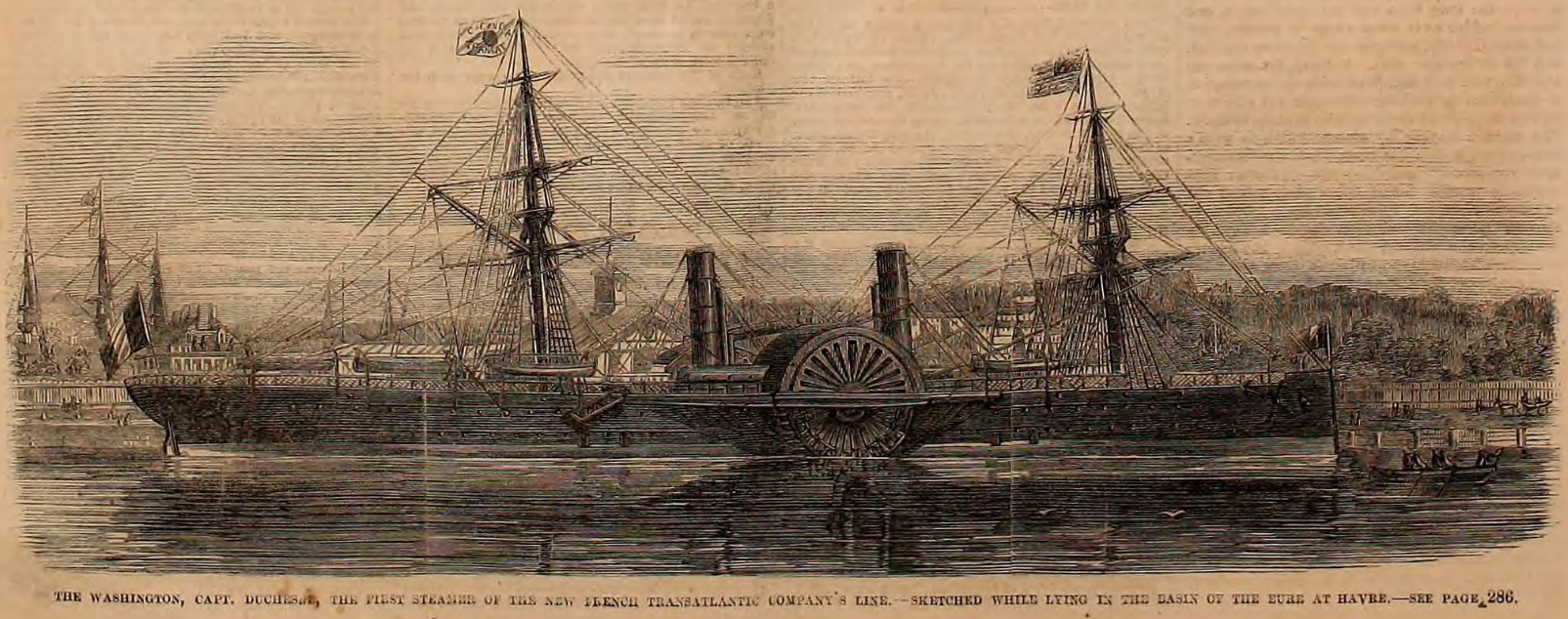
Washington, the first steamer of the company, in 1864

To meet the contractual requirement that its fleet be built in France, the company must find local shipyards. With the construction of its first six ships having begun abroad (in particular SS Washington, the first liner built for the New York route), the Péreires were well aware of the prices charged by foreign shipyards. However, the prices offered by the domestic La Seyne-sur-Mer shipyards were significantly higher. Thus they acquired land near Saint-Nazaire and founded the Chantiers et Ateliers de Saint-Nazaire (later better known as the Chantiers de Penhoët). Engineers from the Scottish shipyards of John Scott came to provide their expertise to French workers and architects. At the time, the shipyards only built the hulls of their ships; the engines inside those ships were purchased from Le Creusot.

In 1862, two years ahead of schedule, SS Louisiane inaugurated the route to Mexico, becoming the company's first success. This route's creation was particularly anticipated by the government because of the second French intervention in Mexico. Two years later, service on the New York – Le Havre route began with the paddle-steamer SS Washington providing postal service. It was later joined by SS France (first of this name) and SS Impératrice Eugénie. In 1867, the company switched from using paddle wheels to using propellers for its ships, partly because they were more fuel efficient. Taking advantage, among other things, of the American Civil War and the weakening of the American fleet, the company succeeded in conquering new markets. The Pereires notably set up a service specifically intended for French emigrants.

An economic and financial crisis in 1868 forced the Pereire brothers to file a petition of bankruptcy and to resign from the company's board. However, the company survived. The Franco-Prussian War of 1870 and the uncertain beginnings of the French Third Republic further reduced the traffic and profits of the transatlantic route while competition from other shipping companies increased. In 1873, as the company was recovering, its first major accident occurred. SS Ville du Havre collided with the sailing ship Loch Earn, with a loss of life of about 226 people. The company's situation seemed catastrophic. In 1875, the Pereires brothers were called back to take over the company's helm again in order to ensure its recovery. That same year, however, Émile died. So it was Isaac and his son Eugène who led the recovery. In particular, they extended their activity by taking advantage of the virtual absence of competition to open a service in the Mediterranean between Marseille and Algiers in 1879. In that same year, the company became public.

=== Overhaul of the fleet and the first large liners (1886–1904) ===
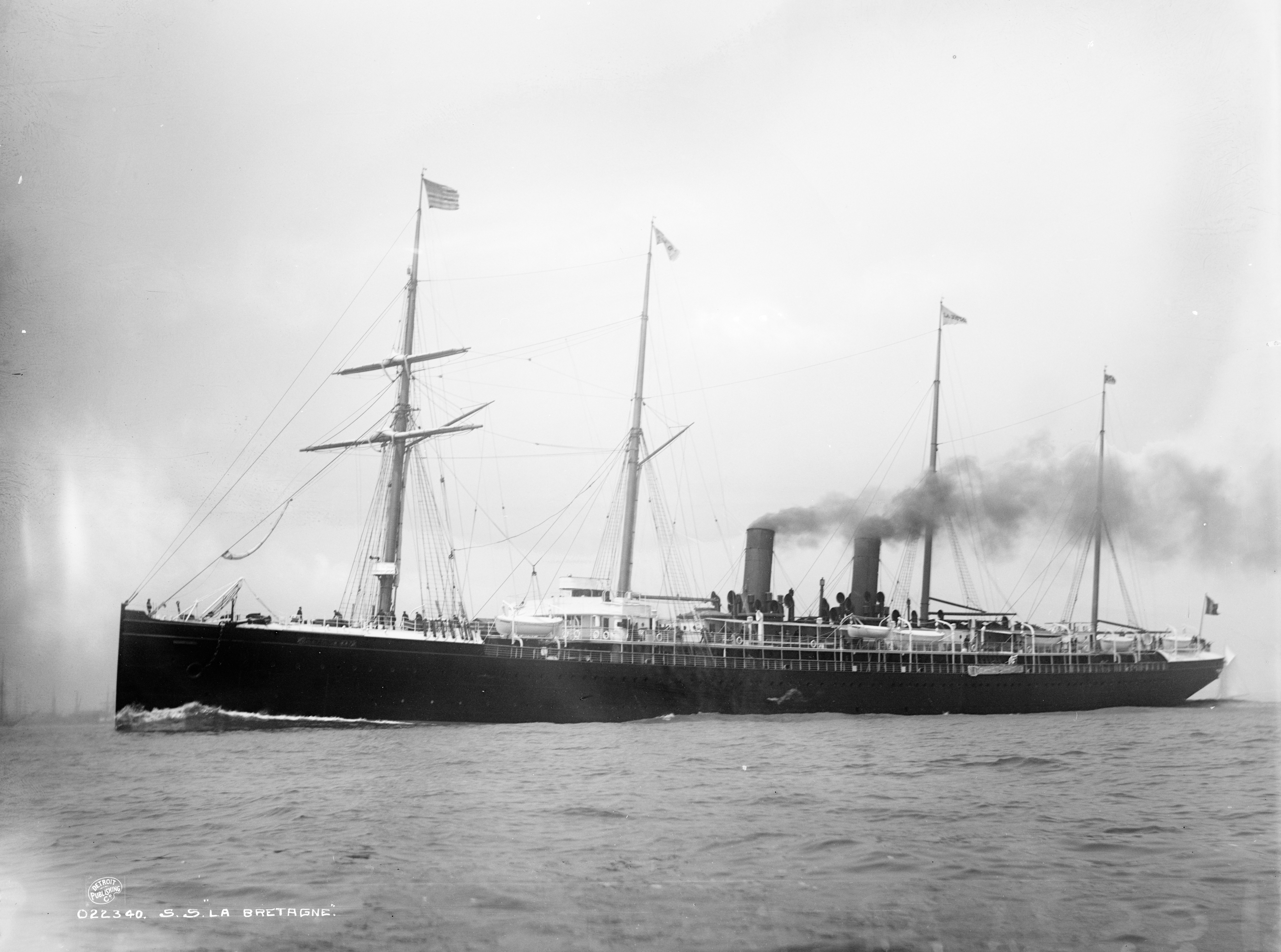
SS La Bretagne of 1886

At the beginning of the 1880s, the need arose to build new, more modern ships. The first, ordered under the name Ville de New York, was put into service under the name of Normandie then quickly renamed La Normandie. With its 145 meters length and its 6,500 gross tonnage, it was the first liner of the company to be equipped with electric lighting and promenade decks. At the same time, the company had to renew the postal agreement of 1861, before its expiration in 1885. The commission responsible for it renewed it in 1883, on the condition that the company quickly obtained four more liners capable of speed greater than 15 knots. This was already the case for La Normandie.

The four new ships were SS La Champagne, SS La Bourgogne, SS La Gascogne, and SS La Bretagne. They were assigned to the New York route in 1886, while a large percentage of the company's older ships were reassigned to the Central America route. Despite this major renewal, the company's fleet was facing increasing competition from foreign shipping companies. The success of these four ships was immediate, however, and revenue almost doubled in four years. The quality of life aboard these liners was also important and contributed to the increased fame of the company. With the White Star Line having just put into service its fast RMS Teutonic, and the Inman Line with its SS City of New York, the company felt the need to respond. This prompted the construction of SS La Touraine in 1891. Slightly larger, and, above all, faster than its predecessors (19 knots on average), it however remained below the performance of its competitors (it narrowly failed to conquer the Blue Riband). Nevertheless, it was built at the right time to allow the replacement of the boilers of SS La Normandie, and especially to take advantage of the World Columbian Exposition to be held in the United States in 1893. In 1894, it was also used for luxury cruise service in the Mediterranean, notably to Istanbul.

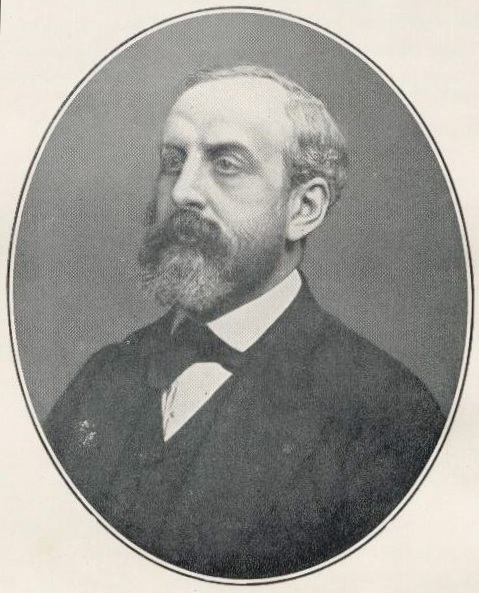
Eugène Pereire, president from 1875 to 1904

The late 1890s were particularly unfavorable for the company for a number of reasons. The Spanish–American War, an economic crisis, and changes in customs legislation, as well as an epidemic of cholera in France partially reduced the passenger traffic, while new, increasingly imposing ocean liners were emerging abroad, such as SS Kaiser Wilhelm der Grosse and RMS Oceanic. Added to this were several maritime disasters, notably the abandonment at sea of SS City of Saint-Nazaire (1897) and the disappearance of the cargo ship Pauillac which was later revealed to have been purchased at a low price from another company and was in poor condition. Worse still for the company was the sinking of its SS La Bourgogne in 1898, which claimed 562 lives. The biggest disaster known to the company, it made a strong impression on public opinion, which quickly judged that the company was responsible for the tragedy.

At the same time, the company was struggling to renovate its fleet. At the end of the 19th century, SS La Touraine, flagship of the fleet, was clearly outdated. The necessary renewal of the postal convention, for adapting to the new demands of the market, hardly came and was only carried out at the turn of the years 1897/1898. It was only then that the building of new ships SS La Lorraine and SS La Savoie could begin; they entered service in 1900 and 1901 respectively. Although much larger than La Touraine, with 170 meters and 11,000 tons, they still struggled to compete by their size with ships such as RMS Celtic. A final growing problem was that of President Eugène Pereire, who had become blind and deaf, and considered increasingly senile. He was finally ousted in 1904 and the board of directors was overhauled. It was the end of the reign of the Pereire family over the company.

=== Under the presidency of Jules Charles-Roux (1904–1914) ===
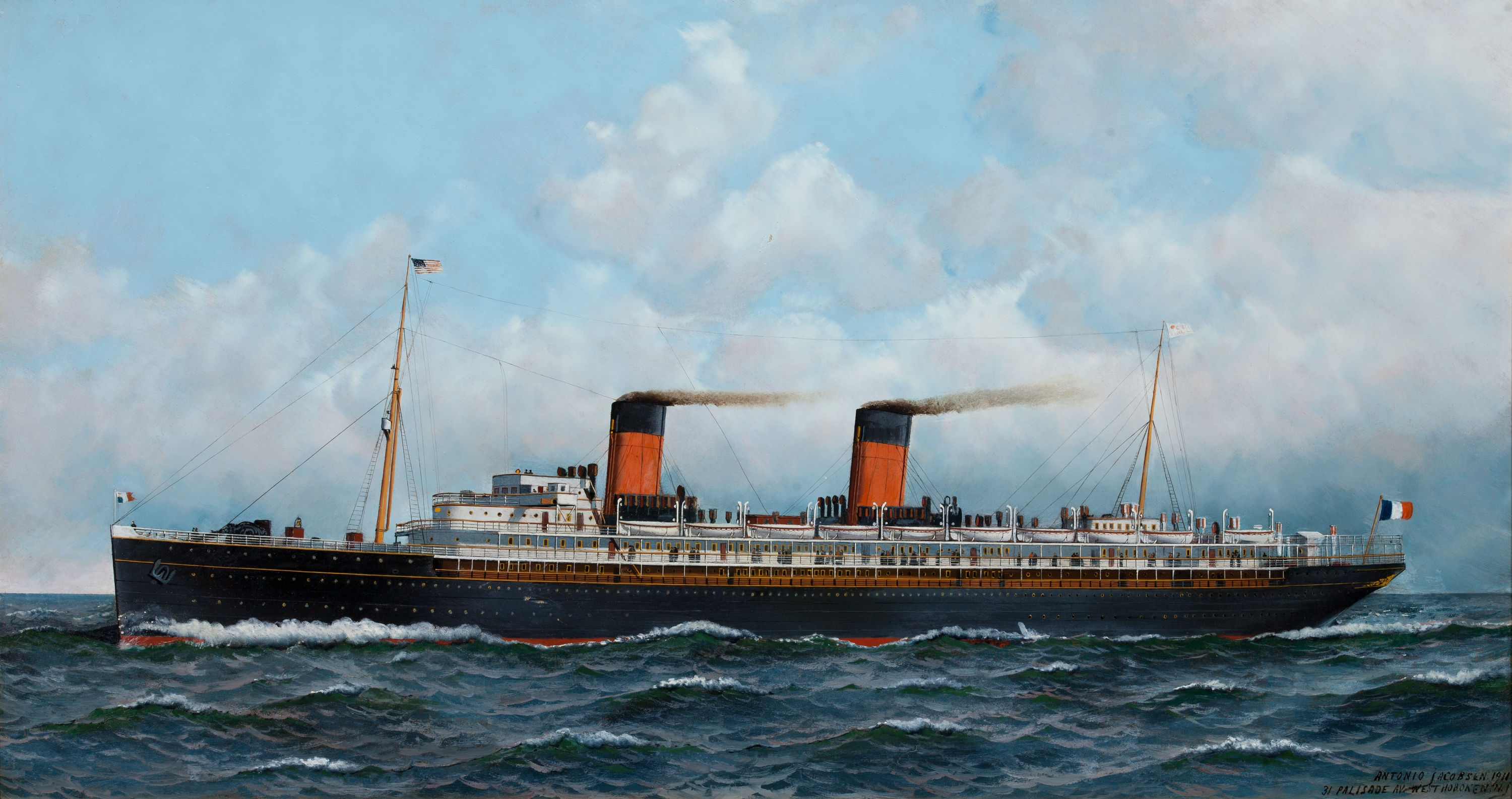
SS La Provence of 1911

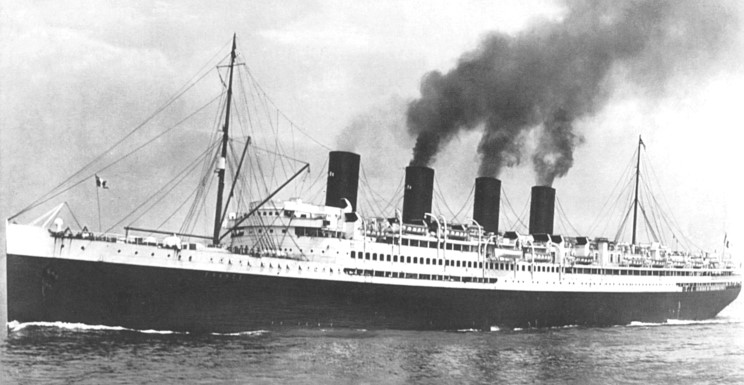
SS France of 1912

In 1904, Jules Charles-Roux became president and instituted a reorganization of the company. His leadership led to a new strategy of winning back customers who had turned away from the company. Charles-Roux took advantage of several trips to the United States to meet with many wealthy industrialists and gain their customer loyalty to the company. In the same vein, he decided on a change of policy by targeting a new clientele. The race for speed seemed to be an increasingly irrelevant idea as the prices of coal made high speeds unprofitable. Charles-Roux and most engineers, who agreed with him on this point, considered that the speed of liners had reached a plateau which can only be exceeded by technological change. The White Star Line had, moreover, made the same observation a few years earlier by putting into service its "Big Four".

The last projects of the former leadership came to fruition in these years, in particular the liner SS La Provence. The third ship built according to the postal agreement of the end of the nineteenth century, it is significantly larger than its predecessors (190 meters, 13,000 tons). The company gradually acquired wealthy customers, while innovations were also installed. La Provence was the company's first liner to be equipped with wireless telegraphy. This allowed passengers to communicate with the mainland, but above all to receive news from the world while aboard. An onboard daily newspaper, L'Atlantique, was created for passengers.

At the same time, the company further developed its cargo service by putting into service a fleet of increasingly large freighters, on the route to North Africa, but also that of New York and from Central America. The weight of goods transported by the company tripled between 1903 and 1913. The company also increased its transportation of emigrants. Although France was not, in itself, a land of emigration, the company benefited from the increase in migrants. In 1907, it came in fifth in terms of the number of migrants transported to the United States, and second place in the reverse direction.

In 1912, the company put into service a new liner, SS France. Even though it remained clearly below its competitors in terms of size, it posted an average speed of 24 knots which was very appreciable at the time, and was 210 meters in length. Its luxury earned it the nickname "the Versailles of the Atlantic," and the ship quickly gained the loyalty of a wealthy clientele. To appeal to less wealthy passengers, the company also launched new ships such as SS Chicago in 1908 and SS Rochambeau in 1911. Smaller and slower, these liners cost less to the company, which mainly operated them for migrants, to whom they often offered services superior to the larger liners of the time. This strategy quickly proved effective, and this type of vessels quickly established itself alongside larger, faster liners which formed the flagship of the fleet.

In the summer of 1913, a new postal agreement was reached, requiring the construction of three new liners before 1932. The building of the first, SS Paris, was immediately started in Penhoët. It was designed to be bigger than its predecessor. The ship was expected to be completed in 1916, but World War I greatly delayed its completion. This decade under the governance of Charles-Roux was on the whole particularly prosperous: the revenues from the main routes almost doubled between 1905 and 1913. However, the operating costs also increased, with the number of ships no fewer than 84 ships. Its results remain comparable to those of its competitors, and the CGT has established itself as a leading French company.

=== The Jules Durand affair ===
In 1910, coal burners in Le Havre went on strike. In response, the company posted inflammatory posters on the quays, mobilized the anti-strike "yellow" union, and demanded that the police protect the freedom to work. Incidents multiplied: confrontation with the police, nighttime sabotage, fights between strikers and non-strikers, etc. On September 10, Louis Dongé, a member of the "yellow" union, was killed in a fight with drunkards. Local company officials seized on this the opportunity to neutralize the strike. Jules Durand, secretary of Le Havre charcoal union, was accused by false witnesses, bought by the company, of having had his union voted for the assassination of Louis Dongé. The strike he had been leading for three weeks then came to an abrupt end.

In Paris, the press ignited. Conservative newspapers (Le Temps, L'Aurore, Le Capitaliste, etc.) denounced the "return to barbarism" and demanded energetic measures against the trade unionists. The government declared itself ready to resort to illegal measures against insurrectional strikes.

At the end of the trial, Jules Durand was sentenced to death. The whole Left mobilized, from the socialist Jean Jaurès to the anarchist Sébastien Faure, including the trade unionist Georges Yvetot and Paul Meunier. Across France, crowds marched against "class injustice" and hundreds of public meetings were organized. Internationally (Italy, United Kingdom, United States, Australia, etc.) strikes and rallies were carried out in support of Durand. Under pressure, President Armand Fallières commuted the sentence to seven years' imprisonment. The mobilizations did not weaken, and Durand was released on February 16, 1911. However, he went insane in his captivity. Traumatized by his detention and sentencing, he experienced delusion of persecution, no longer recognized his relatives and banged his head against the walls. He was placed in a mental asylum until the end of his life in April 1926, and his innocence was officially recognized in 1918.

=== World War I (1914–1920) ===
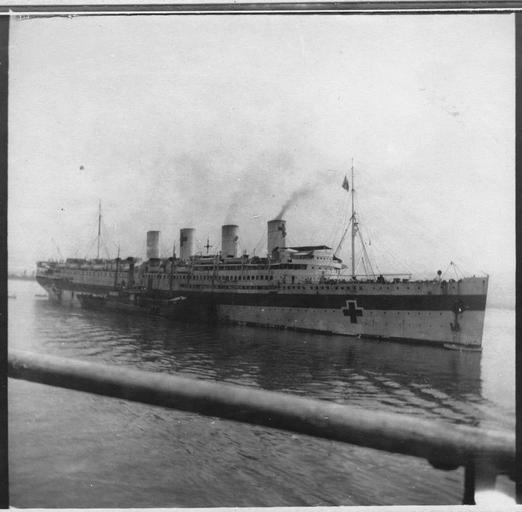
France as a hospital ship in World War I

When World War I broke out in August 1914, company's activity was abruptly halted. Instructions were given to ships moored in ports to remain there until further notice. However, customer pressure was high, with many Americans keen to leave Europe. The company finally made the decision to allow, at its own risk, two crossings for this purpose, using SS Chicago and SS France. However, the cessation of activity remained fairly brief. The French government insisted that the postal service be maintained. After a massive wave of departures for the United States, the number of passengers dropped dramatically. France was taken off service, while smaller ships such as SS Espagne (originally assigned to Central America route), SS Chicago, SS Rochambeau and older ships such as SS La Touraine replaced it on the New York route.

The greatest involvement of the company in the war, however, was in the area of military operations. Thirty-seven ships (two-fifths of the fleet) were requisitioned. Following the example of the British and Germans, the company designated a number of its large liners to serve as auxiliary cruisers. This was the case for SS La Provence, SS La Savoie, SS La Lorraine and SS La Touraine, which were requisitioned at the start of the war to ensure the blockade of Germany. The last two were however quickly returned to postal service.

As the conflict spread to the Middle East, the fleet's presence in the Mediterranean became necessary. Several ships such as SS Charles-Roux and SS France were transformed into hospital ships in order to collect the wounded. The latter was also used to bring troops from the United States. Finally, the liners and freighters that continued their commercial service brought back to Europe many goods necessary for the war effort.

The war resulted in a large number of losses for the company. Submarine warfare, in particular, took a heavy toll. Thirty ships were lost in the conflict. The company struggled to replace them with hastily purchased freighters to continue supporting the war effort. The surviving ships were, for their part, in poor condition. The biggest loss was that of SS La Provence, the second largest ship of the company, which sank in 1916 with more than 1000 victims.

As soon as the war ended, a vast and costly reconstruction program had to be launched. A new era dawned for the company, a feeling reinforced by the death of Jules Charles-Roux in 1918. After a two-year interlude provided by Gaston de Pellerin de Latouche, who himself died in 1920, the presidency was taken over by John Dal Piaz, who had already enjoyed a brilliant career within the company under Eugène Péreire.

=== Under the presidency of John Dal Piaz (1920–1928) ===
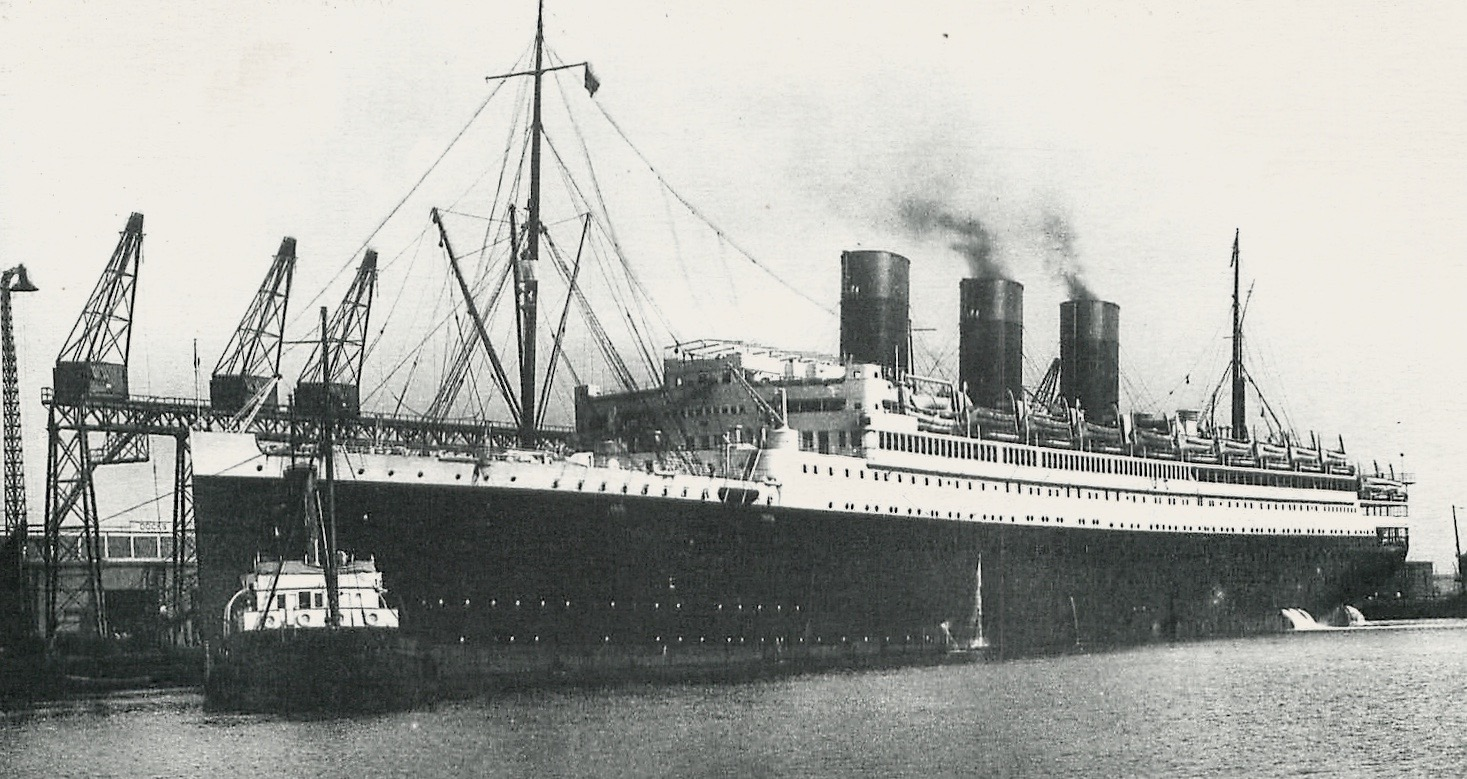
SS Paris of 1921

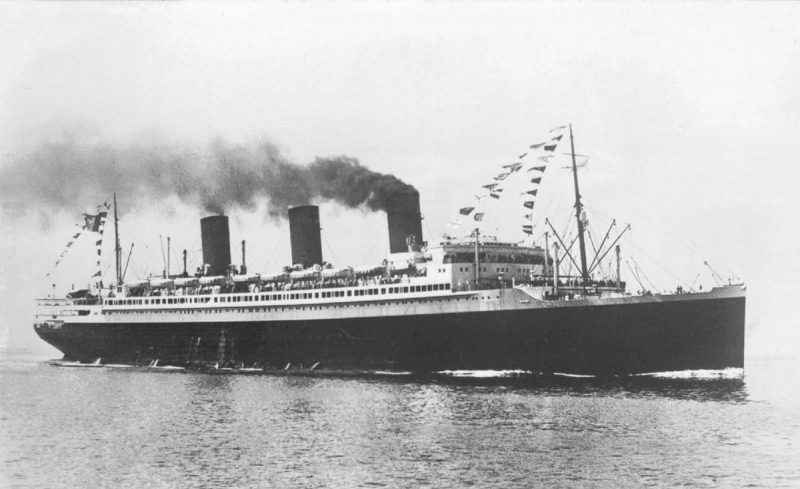
SS Île de France of 1927

Following the war, the company's priority was to rebuild its fleet. It acquired a few ships (three small liners and three freighters) as a result of war reparations, but they never brought in any profit. The building of SS Paris was finished in 1921 to provide the company with a new flagship. Several ships were built between 1921 and 1924, including SS Cuba, bound for Central America, and SS De Grasse. A substantial number of freighters were also built in this decade, bringing the number of ships in the fleet to a hundred at the end of the 1920s. After the war, the flagships of the company, in particular Paris, benefited from an influx of migrants from Central Europe, while winning the loyalty of a wealthy clientele.

In 1927, Île de France was completed and put into service. It was a liner slightly larger than Paris, but more up to date. The first class occupied a greater place on the ship, while the class reserved for immigrants was drastically reduced in size. The particularly luxurious liner attracted the public, who nicknamed it "Rue de la Paix de l'Atlantique." John Dal Piaz also provided the North African route with liners like SS Lamoricière. In order to diversify the company's activity, Dal Piaz created the Société des Voyages et Hôtels Nord Africains in 1925 in order to offer tourist motor car circuits to customers. The system reached its peak in the late 1920s.

The company experienced a success and massively increased its clientele by taking advantage of the Prohibition in the United States, which pushed American passengers to travel on French liners in order to consume alcoholic beverages. In June 1928, John Dal Piaz died after a short illness. The company selected the industrialist André Homberg to succeed him.

=== Great Depression (1929–1939) ===
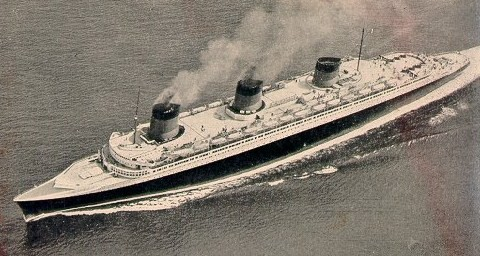
SS Normandie of 1935

Advertisement, circa 1937

Shortly before his death, Dal Piaz had laid the foundations for a project to rejuvenate the fleet. On the transatlantic route, this involved replacing SS France and SS Rochambeau. For the latter, SS Champlain and SS Lafayette, both medium-sized ships, were ordered and expected to be completed in 1932. SS Colombia was put into service on the Central America route. In addition, many freighters were built. Finally, studies were made to design a new ship for the New York route, then named "super Île-de-France" or "T6." Loans were made to cover these numerous expenses.

These projects were launched when the Great Depression began. The company's revenues plummeted, its expenses increased, and the it found itself on the verge of bankruptcy. This forced it to appeal to the government, in particular to renegotiate its postal agreement. Indeed, the T6 could no longer be completed in 1932 as previously agreed. The government agreed to assist the company, on the condition that it became a semi-public company. The company was for a time placed in the hands of Raoul Dautry, before being handed over to two men chosen by the government: Governor General Marcel Olivier, who was appointed as president, and Henri Cangardel who became its Administrator and Chief Executive Officer. A consolidation of finances was undertaken. The oldest liners, like SS France, were sold for scraps, and others like SS Paris were assigned to cruise service in the off-season. The postal agreement was renegotiated in a way more favorable to the company.

At the same time, the building of T6, which in the meantime became Normandie, was controversial. There were those who believed that the money could be better spent elsewhere. However, the investment already made was such that the company would lose a lot if the work was stopped before completion. When the ship was completed in 1935, Cangardel, Olivier, as well as the engineer Jean Marie, engaged in a difficult media exercise with a lot of conferences to extol the merits of the ship. Commanded by Captain Pierre-Louis Thoreux, the liner made a speed record and won the Blue Riband on its inaugural crossing. For the first time, France possessed the largest liner ever built, and also the fastest. The acquired prestige managed to satisfy the press; the company got back on its feet; and the controversy subsided. The following year, significant competition began against the Cunard Line and its liner RMS Queen Mary, it and Normandie having similar level of performances. The company thus found itself on the front of the competition, directly against a foremost shipping company.

=== World War II (1939–1945) ===
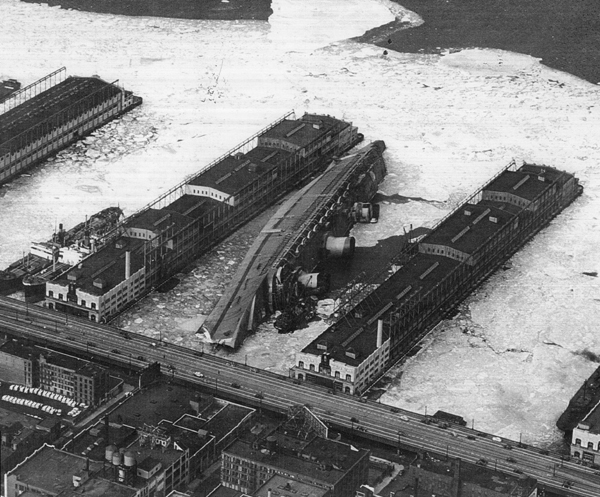
USS Lafayette (formerly Normandie) capsized in 1942

With the start of World War II in 1939, the company was called upon to participate in the war effort. For safety, large liners like SS Normandie and SS Île-de-France were moored in the port of New York. Then the conflict became a war of attrition, but the traffic resumed normally for most of the minor ships of the company, despite Germany's maritime operations, particularly those underwater. However, the Fall of France in June 1940 was all the more painful for the company. The new regime quickly reorganized the management of the company, removing Jean Marie (president since 1939) in favor of Henri Cangardel. The war had already damaged the company's fleet. SS Champlain was sunk by a mine. Moreover, with the war having interrupted all traffic on the Atlantic, the majority of the activity of the company was relocated to the North African route.

However, not all ships fell to the Vichy regime. Remaining in New York, the Normandie was under close surveillance by the American authorities who feared a possible sabotage. Following the attack on Pearl Harbor, the US government requisitioned the ship to support the war effort. It accidentally caught fire and capsized during its conversion into a troopship in February 1942. The largest ship in of the company was thus found to be unusable after only four years of commercial service. The Île-de-France and several other ships benefited from the resistant fiber of company's General Staff, which managed to make them sail on behalf of the forces of Free France and the United Kingdom. In the war, the liner transported 300,000 soldiers, both in the Atlantic and in the Indian Ocean.

After France was liberated, Henri Cangardel was again replaced by Jean Marie. Of the large liners, only the Île-de-France survived (the Paris caught fire shortly before the conflict), and it had to undergo a major refit after its war service. In all, the company lost 13 liners and 40 freighters, representing 60% of each of the two categories. Two thirds of the fleet was sunk.

=== Reconstruction of the fleet (1945–1960) ===
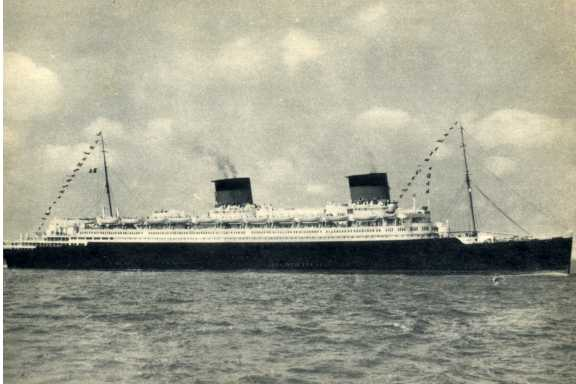
Liberté of 1950

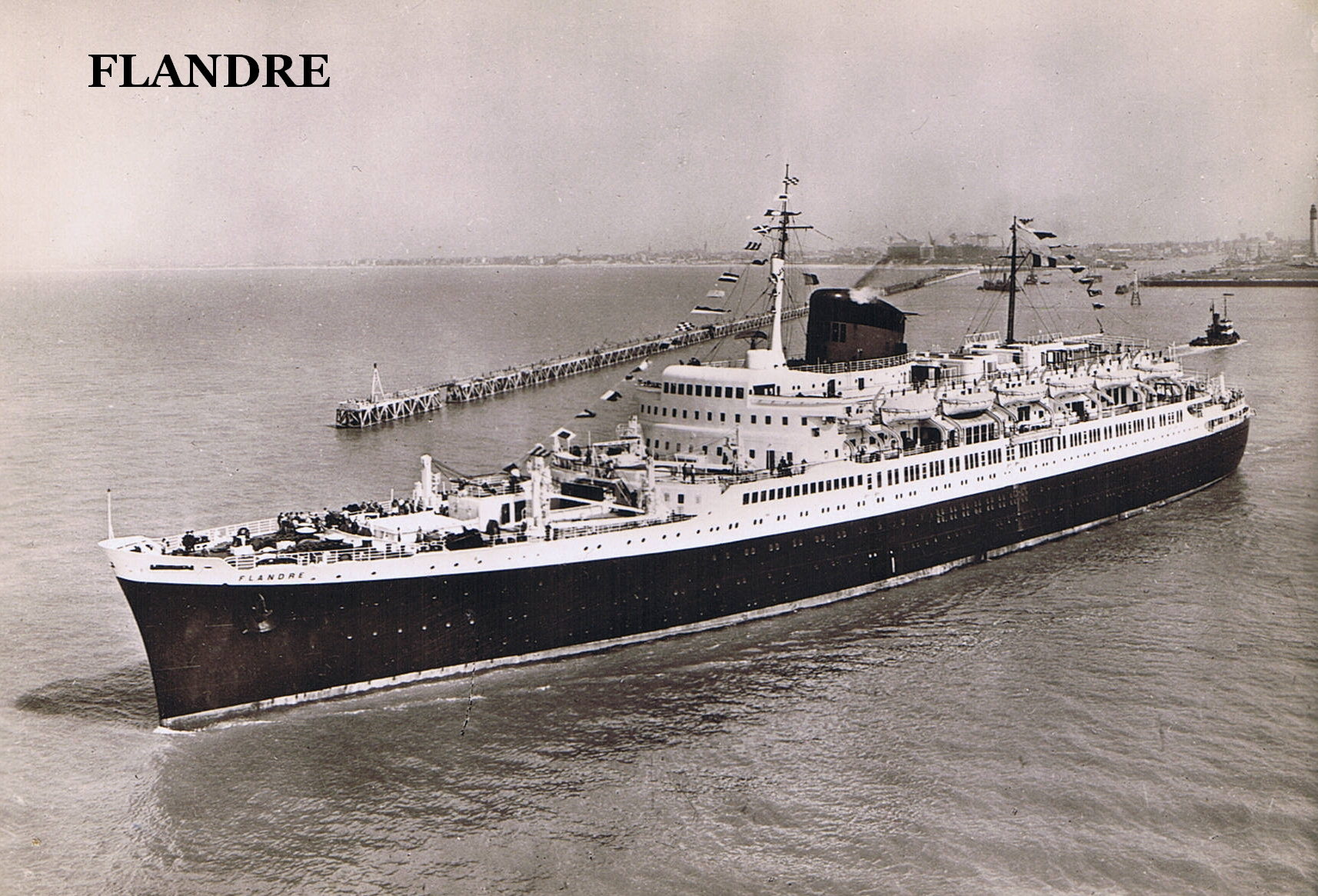
Flandre of 1952

For Jean Marie, the task was enormous. The Île-de-France being under restoration, and the other large ships of the company having been sunk, the company could not restore its transatlantic service immediately. It therefore recovered ships that can be recovered, starting with SS De Grasse, which was put back into service in 1947. SS Île-de-France joined it in 1949. In order to replace the loss of the Normandie, the United States ceded to the company a liner taken from Germany, SS Europa, which was renamed SS Liberté. The Liberté was taken to the port of Le Havre for refitting, but it collided with the wreck of Paris during a storm, causing it to be half-sunk. It was raised and towed to the Ateliers et Chantiers de Saint-Nazaire Penhoët shipyard in Saint-Nazaire to complete its refitting. It entered service in 1950.

In order to replace the large number of cargo ships lost in the war, the company received a total of thirty-two liberty ships. The French government also funded the building of some freighters. For the reconstruction of France and its ports, the CGT transported many tons of freight. The transport of goods became its main activity during this period. On April 14, 1947, the company fell victim to another disaster. The cargo of ammonium nitrate on Grandcamp, one of its Liberty ships, detonated in the Texas City disaster, killing at least 581 people in the deadliest industrial disaster of that period.

In 1950, the company acquired the Compagnie générale transsaharienne, which operated land and air transport across the Sahara. In the area of passenger traffic, recovery was gradual. At first slow at the end of the 1940s, it grew stronger the following decade. In 1952, SS Liberté and SS Île-de-France carried more passengers than the number that the five largest ships in the fleet had carried in 1938. The Antilles routes and North African route, despite the growing importance of air transport, managed to benefit from a stable customer base. The management of the company, especially its president Jean Marie, remained however convinced that aircraft and ocean liner were called upon to serve complementary roles: the aircraft providing a fast transport, and the ocean line providing a voyage that was comfortable for more passengers. The figures seemed, at first, to prove him right. The number of passengers was increasing, and the share of the aircraft remained moderate.

However, the fleet of the company was by then old, and of fewer number than that of foreign companies. This made it difficult to compete, in particular, with RMS Queen Mary and RMS Queen Elizabeth of the Cunard Line, or with new liners such as SS United States or SS Andrea Doria. Faced against them, the company responded only with SS Flandre, a smaller liner intended to replace De Grasse, and with SS Antilles, which was assigned to the Central American route. Gradually the profits decreased as the ships aged. The building of a new large-scale liner was therefore envisaged by Jean Marie.

=== SS France and final success (1960–1974) ===
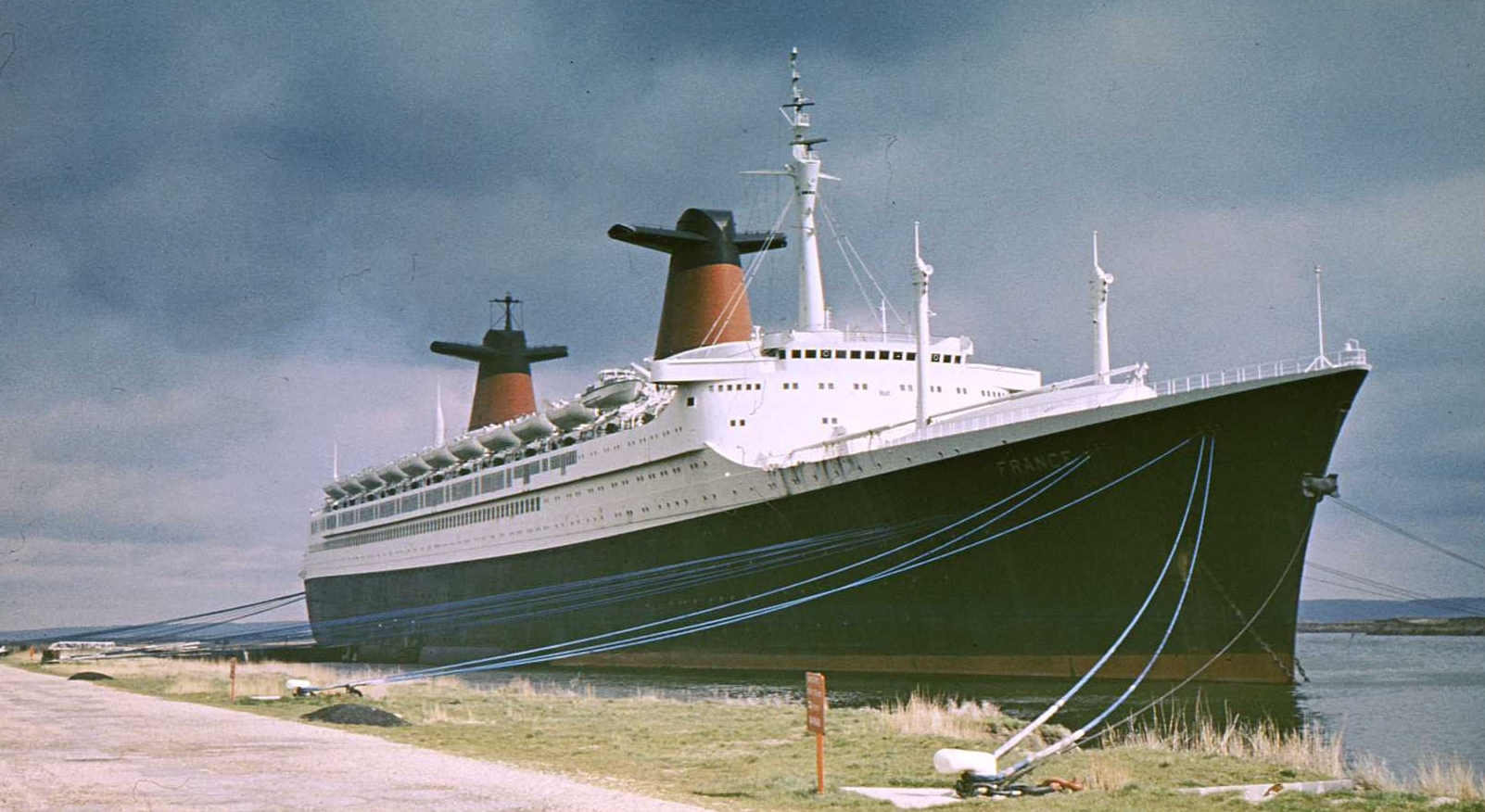
France of 1962

The company's fleet was aging. In 1959, after thirty-two years of service and despite great popularity, the Île-de-France was scrapped. The Liberté reached its 30th birthday in 1960. For Jean Marie, it was essential to give the company a new ship to proudly wear its flag while ensuring that it carried the number of passengers that previously required two to three ships to carry. This was the birth of the liner SS France which was launched in 1960 in the presence of President Charles De Gaulle, and then put into service in 1962. The ship was intended to be large and fast. However, the company made the mistake of devoting 80% of its capacity to the tourist class while air transport gains 80% of those traveling crossing the Atlantic, and less wealthy passengers quickly preferred air travel.

At the same time, the company underwent major changes in its leadership. Jean Marie, whose retirement was scheduled for 1961, must be replaced. Its managing director, Edmond Lanier, was expected to take over, but it was the president of Messageries Maritimes, Gustave Anduze-Faris, who took up the post, before himself retiring in 1963. He was replaced by Pierre Renaud, who left in 1964. Lanier then became president and stayed in the position for nearly ten years.

For several years now, the company had been mostly operating freighters. However, for President Lanier, the defense of SS France as a symbol of the company was essential, while the ship's operational deficits widened from the mid-1960s onward. Various solutions were considered but the regular transatlantic route was losing profits, and the ships which crossed it became more and more rare. Several cruises were organized, including the "imperial" cruise for celebrating the bicentennial of the birth of Napoleon I and the around-the-world cruises in 1972 and 1974. However, the ship, built for the cold climate of the North Atlantic, was not designed for tropical heat, and full-time operation of it as a cruise ship proved costly.

=== End of the CGT (1974–1977) ===
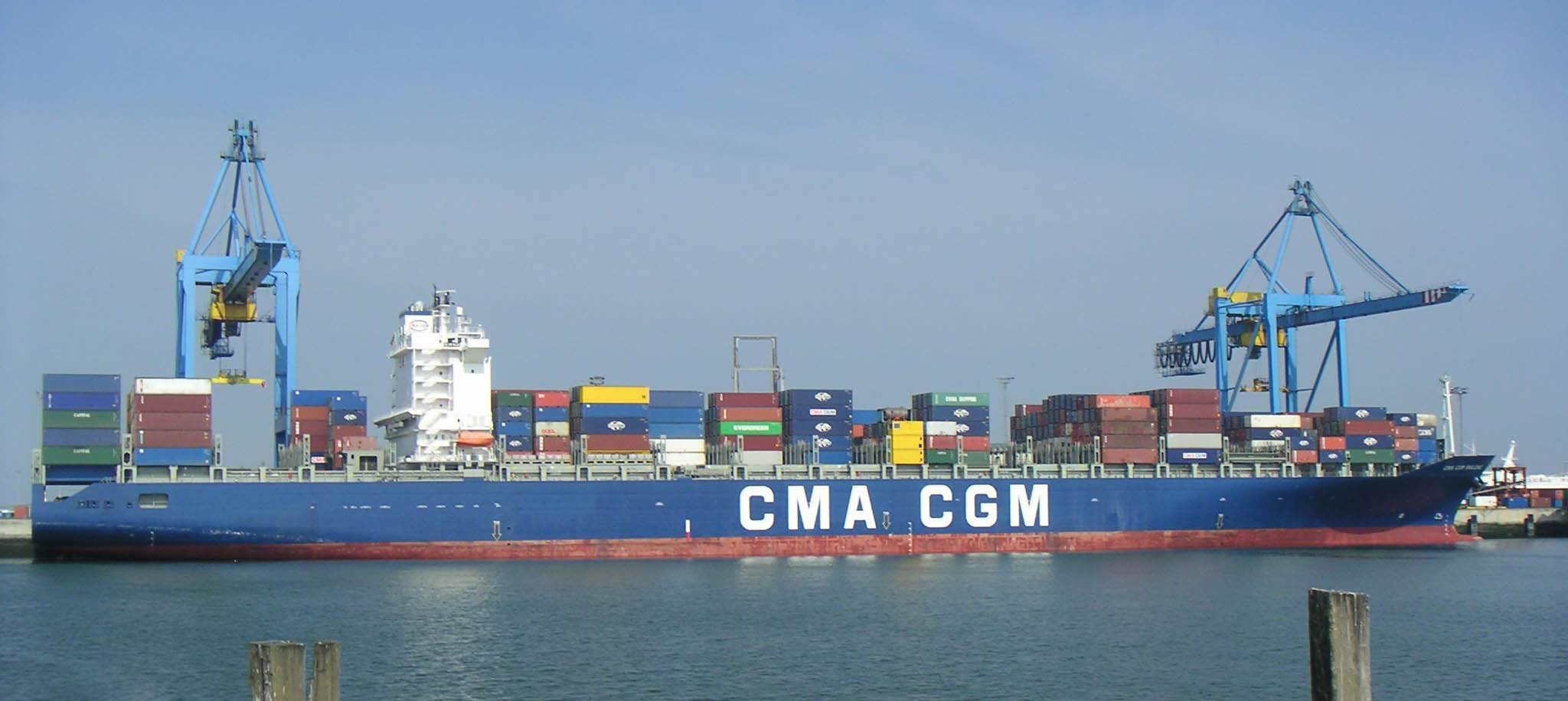
The container shipping company CMA CGM was formed via a merger involving CGT

Following the 1973 oil crisis, the operation of SS France became even less profitable. In February 1974, the French government waived the compensatory subsidy which allowed the liner to continue to sail. Edmond Lanier, its main advocate, retired in September 1973, and died in October of the following year. At the same time, in September 1974, when the France finished its last crossing at Le Havre, the crew mutinied. The ship was finally decommissioned at the end of October. The last liner of the Compagnie Générale Transatlantique stopped sailing.

The company was living its last hours as a passenger ship business. Since the middle of the 1950s, it has devoted an increasingly important part of its activity to freight traffic. In 1976, the company merged with the Compagnie des Messageries Maritimes de Marseille to form the Compagnie Générale Maritime. The CGM operated as a container ship business. In 1996, CGM merged with Compagnie Maritime d’Affrément, becoming CMA CGM, one of the world's largest container shipping companies.

== List of presidents ==
The presidents of the CGT were:

- Compagnie générale maritime
  - Adolphe d'Eichthal, 1855–1861
- Compagnie générale transatlantique
  - Émile Pereire, 1861–1868
  - Mathieu Dollfus, 1869–1871
  - Édouard Vandal, 1871–1875
  - Eugène Pereire, 1875–1904
  - Jules Charles-Roux, 1904–1918
  - Gaston de Pellerin de Latouche, 1918–1920
  - John Dal Piaz, 1920–1928
  - André Homberg, 1928–1931
  - Raoul Dautry, 1931–1932
  - Marcel Olivier, 1932–1939
  - Jean Marie, 1939–1940
  - Henri Cangardel, 1940–1944
  - Jean Marie, 1944–1961
  - Gustave Anduze-Faris, 1961–1963
  - Pierre Renaud, 1963–1964
  - Edmond Lanier, 1964–1973

== Activities ==
=== Routes ===
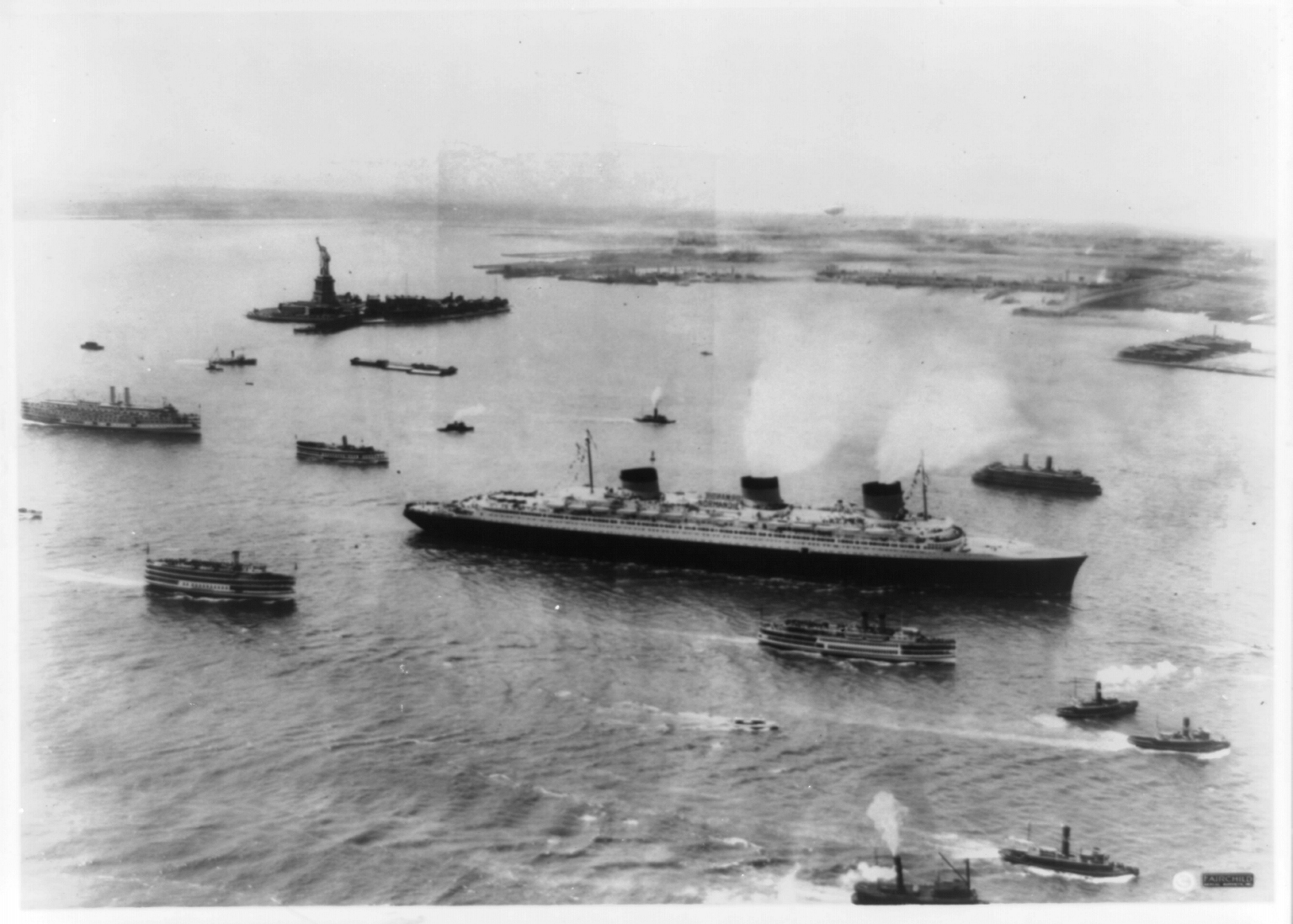
Normandie arriving in New York on its maiden voyage

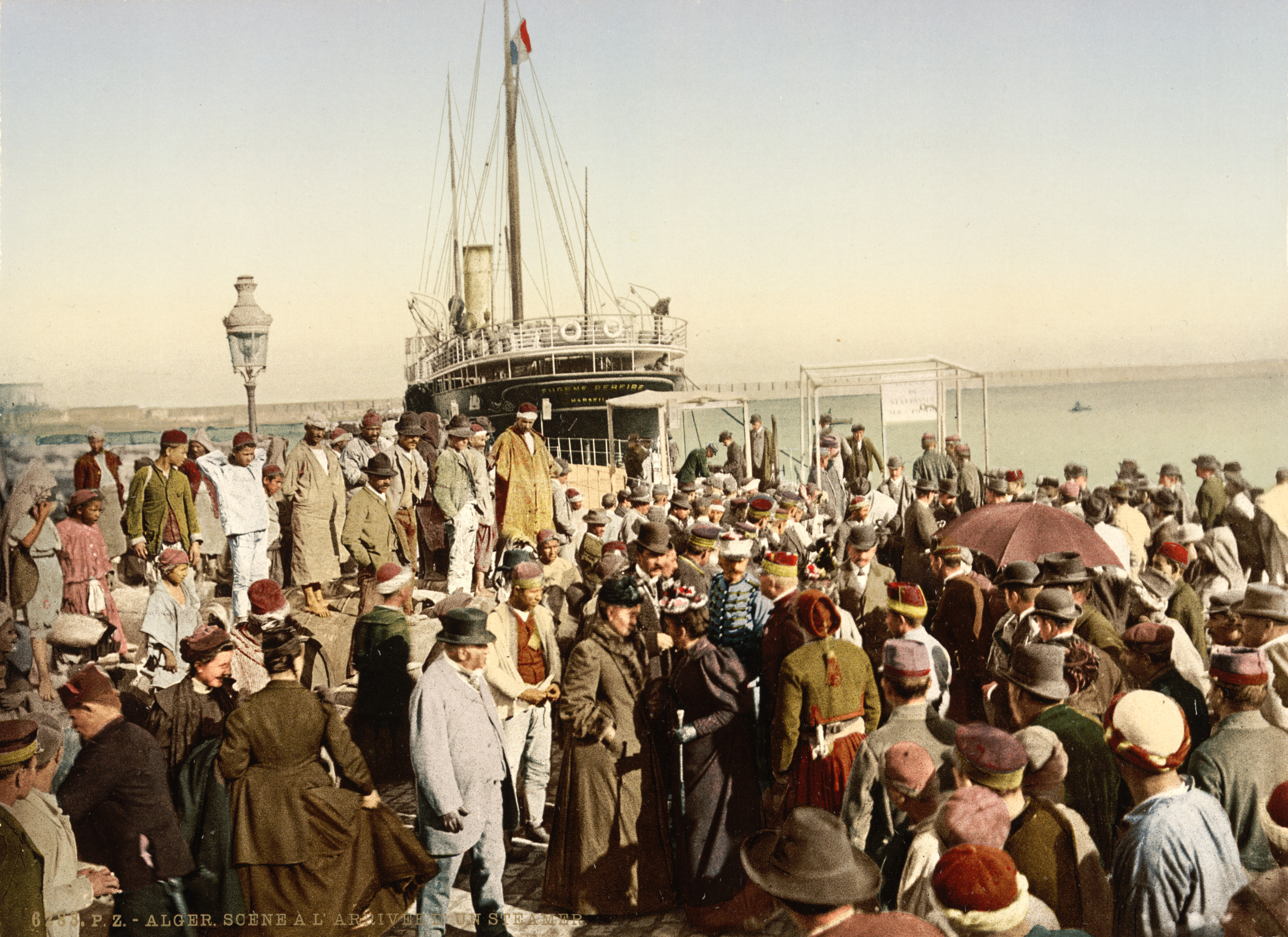
Arrival of SS Eugène Péreire at Algiers, Algeria in 1899

The main route served by the Compagnie Générale Transatlantique is the Le Havre – New York route, inaugurated in 1864 and operated almost continuously until 1974. It was on this route that the most advantageous postal agreements were negotiated, that the passengers were the most numerous, and the liners the most prestigious. The company's flagships, from SS La Champagne to SS Normandie to SS France, were built for this route, which brought in more than half of the revenues of the company. This did not prevent the liners from taking part, in the off-season, in cruises, such as the Mediterranean cruises of SS La Provence, the around-the world cruise of the France, or the cruise of the Normandie to Rio de Janeiro.

The demand for routes to Central America and the West Indies were also heavily exploited. The route to Mexico was the first, opened by the company in 1862. Several aged liners were, once replaced on the New York route, assigned near the end of their career to this route. However, several large ships of the company, such as the Cuba, the Columbie, and Antilles, also served on it. This route also gradually became very popular, especially after World War II, with the company's freighters, which brought back to France large quantities of rum, sugar and bananas.

In 1879, the company obtained agreements for the operation of a route off-center in relation to its main activities, that which connected Marseille to Algiers. Requiring different ships designed for short crossings, it quickly became prosperous, and several ships were assigned to it, such as Ville d'Alger which, in the 1930s, won the speed record on this route, and SS Lamoricière, which sank on this route. Gradually a traffic of goods was also set up on this route, in particular cereals, fruits and wines, which compensated for the losses caused by the competition of the aircraft for the passenger traffic.

The company has also served Corsica since July 6, 1880, using the liner Ville de Madrid on the route Marseille – Ajaccio – Bône – Algiers. In 1882, the company inaugurated routes entirely dedicated to Corsica extending to Sardinia from Marseille and Nice.

=== Venture in the aviation industry ===
Although the activities of the Compagnie Générale Transatlantique had always been centered around the oceans, the company could not ignore the technological progress in the area of civil aviation made at the beginning of the 20th century. This new tool quickly appeared to be very valuable in the company's postal activities. Thus, in 1928, John Dal Piaz had a seaplane catapult installed on SS Île-de-France, which enabled mails to be delivered to their recipients one day before the ship's arrival at its destination. The arrival of Henri Cangardel in the management sphere of the company, in 1933, accentuated this gaze towards the sky. Cangardel had, in fact, been commissioned a few years earlier to participate in the study of the Compagnie générale aéropostale. He thus became friends with great pilots like Jean Mermoz and Antoine de Saint-Exupéry. In 1933, the company Air France was created, but the problem concerning the transatlantic route, for which no connection by plane was yet possible, remained.

It was within this framework that Air France Transatlantique, in which the CGT had a large share, was created in 1937, in order to bring its experience regarding routes. As the airline studied the various possible routes, the shipping company shared its expertise in the field of meteorology, continuing its studies using the ship Carimaré. From 1937 to 1939, Air France Transatlantique made twelve seaplane flights between France and the United States via the Azores, as well as the first flight between New York and Biscarrosse without stopover. The war subsequently hampered the development of the airline, and representatives of the CGT were excluded from the airline after 1945, before its merger with Air France.

Despite this setback, however, the CGT was no stranger to air traffic. Even though its leaders underestimated the competition from aircraft on the transatlantic route, they were perfectly aware of its power on the Mediterranean route, and of the impact it has on the route Marseille – Algiers. Many companies were flourishing on the route, frightening both Air France and the CGT. The latter, under the impetus of Edmond Lanier], who was in charge of aviation issues, then decided to provide financial support to the Compagnie Air Transport, being eager to get involved in the aviation industry once again. The CGT also contributed to the creation of Compagnie des Transports Aériens – Air Algérie, and established a majority stake in it. The airline seemed promising, but Algeria gaining its independence ended the CGT's stake in the airline in 1962.

== Ships ==
=== Technological evolution ===
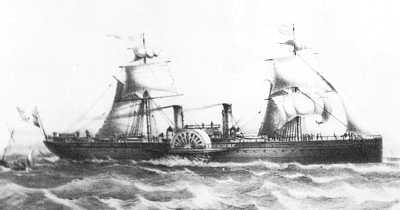
Impératrice Eugénie, one of the first liners of the CGT, used sails and paddle wheel

From its inception, the CGT gradually adopted new technological innovations. This was particularly the case with propulsion. Washington, when it entered service in 1864, was propelled by paddle wheels. In 1868, it was refitted to become the first liner to be propelled by twin propellers, which allowed for higher speeds. At that time, passengers still showed some suspicion towards steam propulsion, however, and until the 1890s all of the company's ships were fitted with masts capable of carrying sails. Thus, the first express liners of the company, SS La Normandie and SS La Champagne, traveled using both sails and steam. The last liner of the company to travel using both these at the same time was SS La Touraine. It was then considered from that point on that multiple propellers were sufficient precaution in the event of engine failure. The masts were not abandoned, however, since they served as a support for the lookout nests, lighting, and later, the telegraph cables.

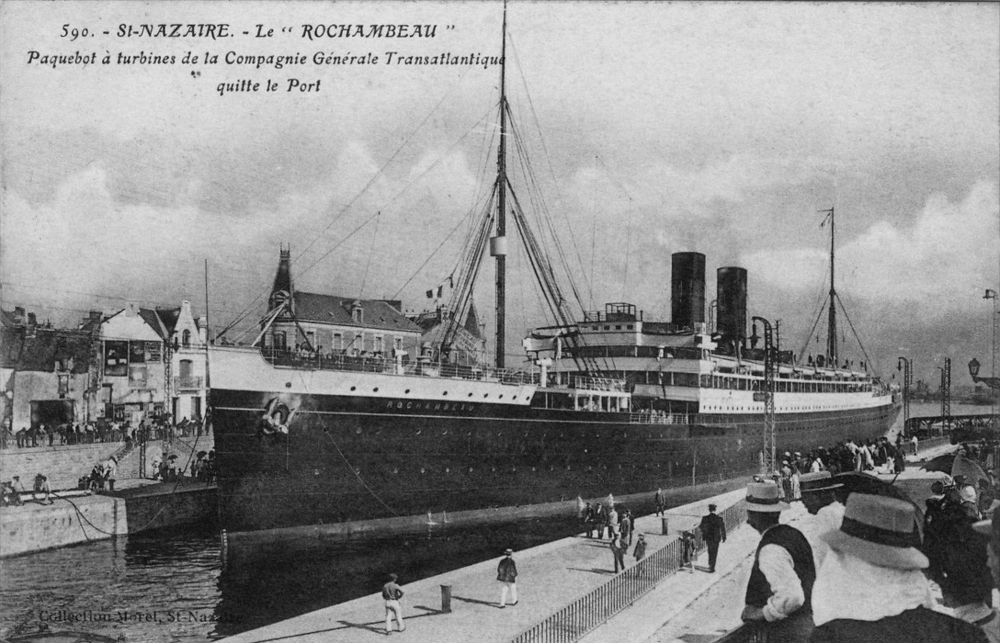
SS Rochambeau of 1911 was the first CGT ship to combine reciprocating steam engines with steam turbines

SS Rochambeau of 1911 was CGT's first ship to be propelled by a combination of reciprocating steam engines and exhaust steam turbines. This configuration was intended to achieve higher fuel efficiency than either reciprocating engines or steam turbines alone, and to be more flexible at low speeds than a ship propelled by direct-drive turbines. SS France of 1912 was propelled purely by steam turbines, which allowed it to reach high speeds and to be one of the fastest ships of its time, behind RMS Lusitania and RMS Mauretania. In 1935, SS Normandie marked the peak of these technological innovations. It had a hydrodynamic hull designed by the architects of the Chantiers de Penhoët with the help of Vladimir Yourkevich. Added to this was a turbo-electric propulsion considered to be more reliable and economical for a ship of this size.

The company also kept pace with innovations affecting passenger comfort. In 1882, SS La Normandie was the first ship of the company to be equipped with electric light, replacing the dangerous kerosene lamps. SS La Provence was the first ship of the company to be equipped with wireless telegraphy (six years after SS Kaiser Wilhelm der Grosse, the first liner to be equipped with this technology). This technology was, at the time, seen as a gadget intended for wealthy passengers, and not as a security tool. In particular, it made it possible to publish an onboard newspaper communicating news from the outside world.

Finally, the company innovated little by little in the field of safety at sea. SS France of 1912 was the first large liner of the company to be equipped with enough lifeboats for all its passengers, only one week after the sinking of RMS Titanic. In 1935, the Normandie was for its part particularly secure from danger of onboard fire, which affected several large ships and became the main danger at sea. The safety of passengers during the crossing was also ensured, with a gradual improvement of the onboard medical area. In 1965, SS France became the first liner to transmit by satellite the electrocardiogram results of one of its passengers, allowing a surgery to be conducted at sea in collaboration with European and American teams.

=== Artistic decoration ===
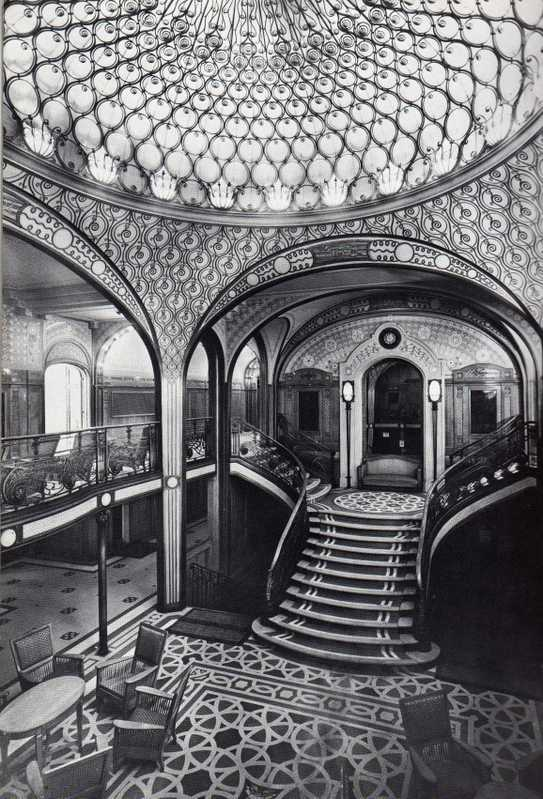
The main staircase aboard SS Paris

The CGT, being far away from major migratory routes, and restricted in the development of its ships by the size of the port of Le Havre, was not really able to benefit from the financial windfall from emigrants, as the German and British companies did. The company therefore specialized in wealthy passengers, who quickly became its main market. At the beginning of the 19th century, the company's liners thus developed a reputation for being sumptuous ships, where the French art of living — especially gastronomy and wine — reigned supreme. SS France of 1912 was the first to truly benefit from this reputation. Its particularly sumptuous decoration (even loaded, compared to its British rivals), was inspired by great works of French architecture: castles, mansions, etc. In addition, there were copies of famous works of art, which gave to the ship the nickname "Versailles of the Atlantic." This level of decoration had already been successful on SS La Provence, SS La Savoie, and SS La Lorraine.

In the 1920s, on SS Paris the style evolved. The Art Deco style began to appear, without completely replacing the decorations of the Belle Époque. The number of services offered to passengers — such as movies and dance events — were increasing. The ship underwent a major refit in 1929, following a fire, which allowed its style to be updated. SS Île-de-France stood out much more; it was designed as a ship to represent the architecture of its time. Great French architects and decorators are thus invited to fill the spaces of the ship, which were larger than usual. Moreover, the long career of the ship allowed it to carry multiple different styles. Once again, the facilities offered on board were multiple: panoramic café, boxing ring, chapel, etc.

With SS Normandie, the same perspective was pursued on a much wider scale. As the ship was of enormous proportions, it was equipped with a monumental dining room occupying three of its decks. There were luxury suites and works of art typical of 1930s French art were displayed throughout the ship. With Normandie, the aim was also to promote French etiquette abroad. After World War II, when the time came to refit SS Île-de-France and to rebuild SS Liberté, certain decorative elements of Normandie were used to give a more familiar atmosphere to the two ships, which were refitted to adopt the styles of the early 1950s.

SS France of 1962 featured the very colorful fittings of the 1960s, once again appealing to the famous artists of that period. This time, however, the company changed its policy. It, which until then favored the first class, now devoted more than three quarters of its facilities to the tourist class.

=== Maritime disasters ===
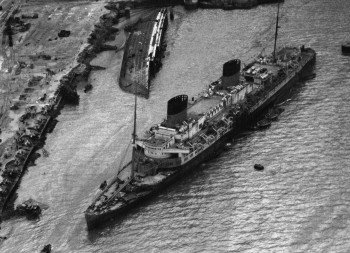
SS Liberté half-sunk after colliding with the wreck of SS Paris at Le Havre in 1946

The history of Compagnie Générale Transatlantique was marked by several major maritime disasters. In 1873, the liner SS Ville du Havre, which had just entered service after a major refit, twice collided with other ships. On June 6, it collided with and sank a sailboat in the Hudson River, but escaped without serious damage. On November 22, it collided with the iron clipper Loch Earn and sank in about ten minutes with the loss of 226 lives; only 61 passengers and 26 crew members survived. On March 6, 1897, SS Ville de Saint-Nazaire experienced a major hull leak and had to be abandoned. Out of 83 people aboard, only 18 survived. The deadliest event was the sinking of SS La Bourgogne in 1898, following a collision with a sailing ship. 568 people perished. Only 13% of the passengers survived while 48% of the crew did; this contrast in casualties resulted in a scandal that weakened the position of Eugène Péreire within the company.

In the 1930s, the French shipping industry was affected by the fire on and the sinking of MS Georges Philippar of the Messageries Maritimes on its maiden voyage and by the 1933 fire aboard SS L'Atlantique of the Compagnie de Navigation Sud Atlantique, a subsidiary of the CGT. In 1938, SS Lafayette, a barely eight-year-old liner, caught fire in the port of Le Havre. The ship was rendered unusable and sent for scrapping. In 1929, SS Paris caught fire while docked at Le Havre and was severely damaged, but was successfully repaired and returned to service. However, ten years later in 1939, it caught fire again at Le Havre; this time the water used to put out the fire caused it to capsize; the wreck remained there until after World War II. In 1946, The newly acquired SS Liberté was being refitted at Le Havre when a heavy gale blew it into the wreck of Paris, causing Liberté to run aground. It was refloated, repaired, and put into service. The wreck of Paris, meanwhile, was scrapped on site in 1947. The most famous fire that affected the company was that of the Normandie. It had been seized by the U.S. and was under conversion into a troopship in February 1942 when welding set it on fire. The inexperience of American sailors recently assigned to the liner effectively rendered the numerous fire protection devices aboard ineffective. The water poured into it caused it to capsize. It was salvaged and scrapped in 1943.

The company lost many ships in the two World Wars. Thirty of the company's ships were sunk in World War I, the first of which was SS La Provence, which was sunk by torpedo with the loss of about a thousand lives. In World War II, the company lost 53 ships. They included 13 liners, with SS Champlain (lost to a mine) and SS De Grasse (which was refloated and returned to service after the war) among them. The company also lost SS Lamoricière in the war due to a storm en route between Algiers and Marseille in 1942, killing nearly 300 people and leaving 90 survivors.

== Legacy ==
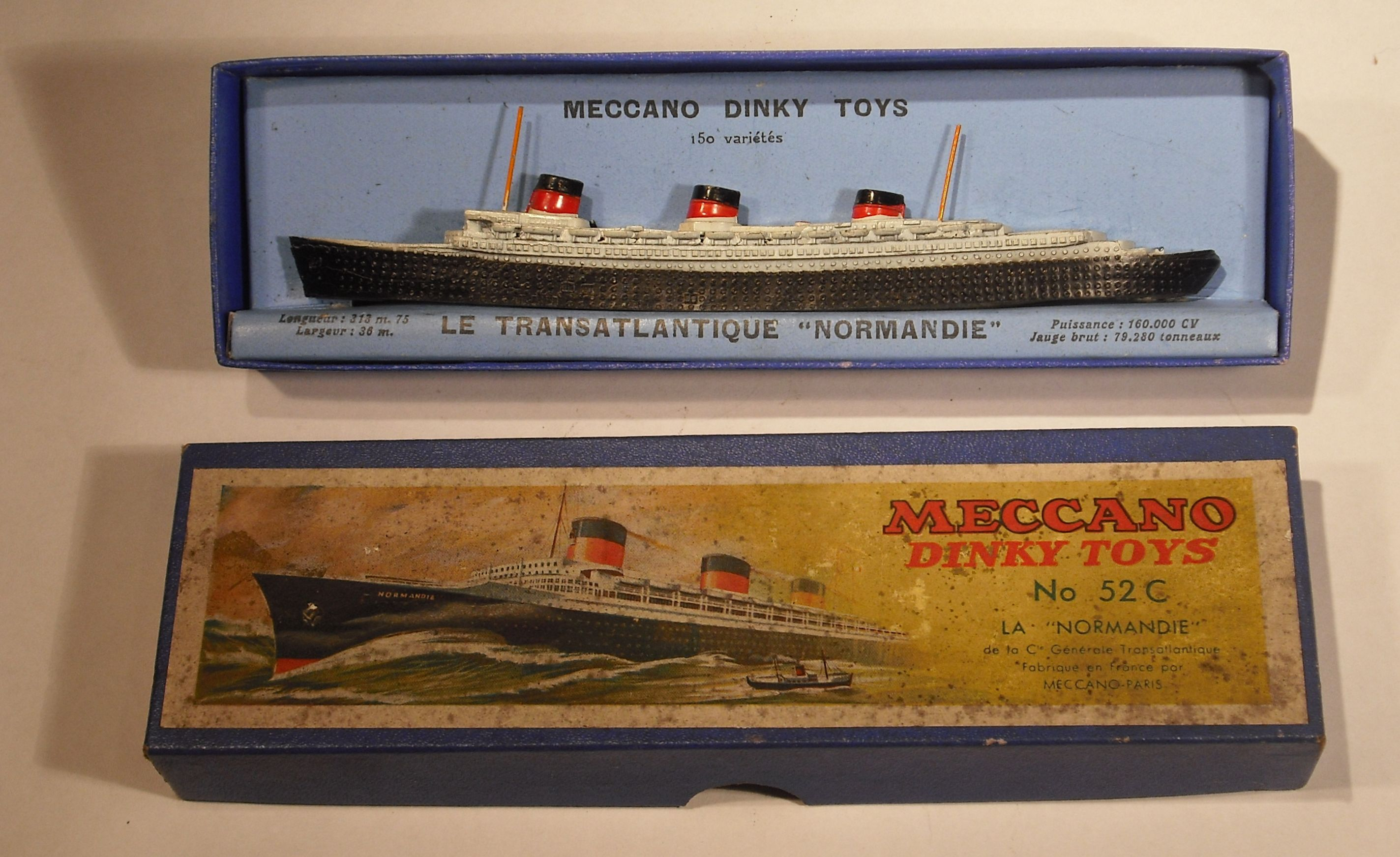
The liners of the CGT have been the subjects of many items for collectors, such as this waterline model of SS Normandie

In its 120 years of existence, the Compagnie Générale Transatlantique has acquired a special place within the French shipping industry, and a particular prestige with foreign customers, especially Americans. Its large liners, especially SS Normandie and SS France, have been the subject of numerous works. The company benefited from a special aura, in particular thanks to the celebrities who have traveled aboard its ships. Traveling aboard also inspired artists: it was after a trip aboard SS Flandre (then renamed Carla C) that a passenger wrote a book titled Love Boats. The French film Paris-New York was filmed aboard Normandie in 1939, with Michel Simon and Gaby Morlay as star actors. SS France of 1962 served as the setting for the final scene of the French film The Brain with Bourvil and Jean-Paul Belmondo, as well as for Gendarme in New York, with Louis de Funès.

The company's ships also gained a certain amount of affection from the public. The accidental end of Normandie aroused indignation; it remained stifled by the scale of the war that reigned at the time. This did not prevent the emergence of persistent rumors about sabotage as the cause of the fire. The scrapping of SS Île-de-France in 1959 caused its share of protests; the liner had, in its career, acquired great affection from the public as a result of its exemplary service in the conflict, as well its rescue of the survivors of the sinking of SS Andrea Doria. The decommission of SS France in 1974, also created strong emotion: Michel Sardou dedicated a song, titled Le France, to it to express his anger. Once the ship was returned to service under the name SS Norway for Norwegian Cruise Line, it aroused great enthusiasm each time it returned to France, where the French press and the French public continued to regard it as the France until it was scrapped at the end of the 2000s.

Some relics of the cargo ship Wisconsin, built for CGT in 1929, are preserved in Szczecin, Poland. The ship was sold to Poland in 1951 and was scrapped in 1985. Its mast was erected as a monument and a part of its superstructure has also been preserved.

Finally, the company's legacy survives through the collectibles carried by passengers, and sold at auction: postcards published by the Company at the beginning of the 20th century, representing the ships painted by Ernest Lessieux, luggage tags, dishes, menus, etc. Since 1995, the French Lines Association, created on the initiative of the Compagnie Générale Maritime, has kept the archives and objects once owned by the CGT, and ensures the enhancement of this heritage, in particular through exhibitions and sales of those objects. Other future projects continue to highlight the heritage of the company, such as the planned building of a new ship named France by Didier Spade.

== See also ==
- List of ships of the Compagnie Générale Transatlantique

== Bibliography ==
- Rémy, Max; Le Boutilly, Laurent (2016). Les "Provinces" Transatlantiques 1882–1927 (in French). Éditions Minimonde76. ISBN 9782954181820.
- Barbance, Marthe (1955). Histoire de la Compagnie Générale Transatlantique : un siècle d'exploitation maritime [History of the Compagnie Générale Transatlantique: A Century of Maritime Operations] (in French). Paris: Arts et métiers graphiques. LCCN 56030338.
- Brouard, Jean-Yves (1998). Paquebots de chez nous [Our Ocean Liners] (in French). MDM. ISBN 2-909313-53-0.
- Le Goff, Olivier (1998). Les Plus Beaux Paquebots du Monde [The World's Most Beautiful Ocean Liners] (in French). Solar. ISBN 9782263027994.
- Offrey, Charles (1994). Cette grande dame que fut la Transat [The Grand Lady That Was Transat] (in French). MDV. ISBN 9782910821005.
- Ollivier, Frédéric (2005). "Normandie": un chef-d'œuvre français (1935–1942) (in French). Chasse-marée. ISBN 2914208804.
- Trihan, Ludovic (1991). La Compagnie Générale Transatlantique, histoire de la flotte (in French). Glénat. ISBN 9782723413916.
- Banet-Rivet, Raoul (2012). Souvenirs 1893–1958 (in French). BoD. ISBN 9782810624751.
- Streater, Les (2010). Normandie: France Afloat. marpubs. ISBN 9780953103584.
