= SS Antilles =

French cruise ship that ran aground and sank off Mustique

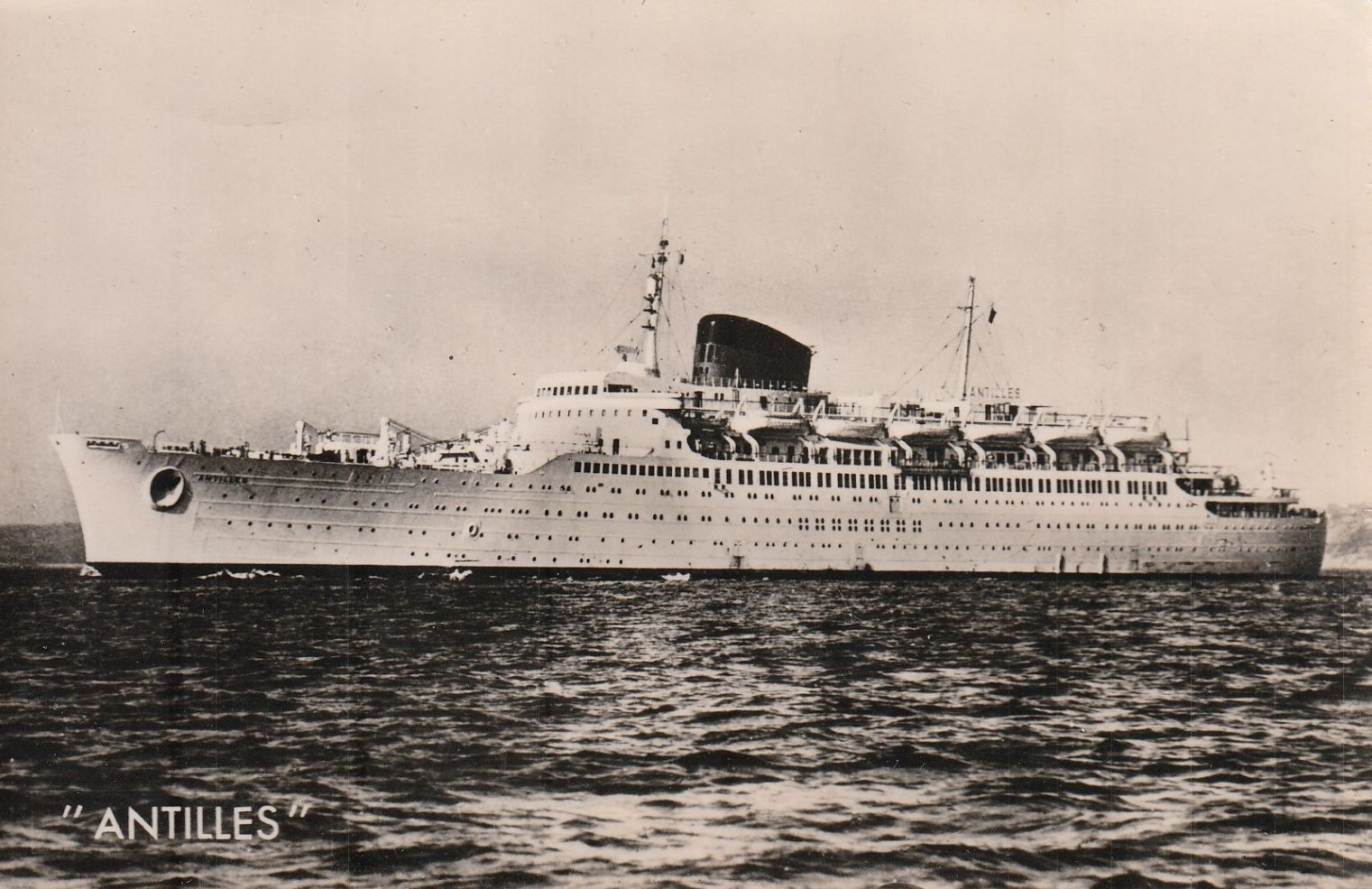
- Postcard of SS Antilles

History

France
- Name: SS Antilles
- Owner: Compagnie Générale Transatlantique
- Operator: Compagnie Générale Transatlantique
- Port of registry: Le Harve (1952-1968) Genoa (1968-1971)
- Route: Caribbean Sea
- Ordered: 1952
- Builder: Arsenal de Brest
- Laid down: 1952
- Launched: 29 April 1951
- Christened: 1953
- Completed: 1953
- Maiden voyage: 1953
- In service: 1953
- Out of service: 1971
- Fate: Grounded and burned 8 January 1971
- Notes: Many of the ships lifeboats were used by the locals of Mustique for many years after her wrecking.

General characteristics
- Type: Ocean Liner
- Tonnage: 19,828 GRT
- Length: 182.53 m (598.9 ft)
- Beam: 24.4 m (80 ft)
- Draft: 8 m (26 ft)
- Installed power: Steam turbines Oil fired boilers
- Speed: 23.8 knots (44.1 km/h; 27.4 mph)

Built for the French Line, Antilles was a near-sister to SS Flandre of 1952. Her construction was completed and her maiden voyage made in 1953. She differed from her sister mainly because she was painted white. She was placed on West Indies cruise service in the 1960s.

== Construction ==
The Construction process and details of Antilles’ construction are murky and confusing. Most, if not all sources state Antilles was built by the Brest Arsenal. Although this doesn’t make much sense as Antilles was built for a civilian purpose and the arsenal has only been stated to build warships for the French Navy. Could it be that Antilles was built for a navel purpose originally? It also has been stated that Antilles was built in 1951 but it’s also stated that Antilles wasn’t ordered by Compagnie Générale Transatlantique (French Line) or laid down until 1952 which causes more confusion. To say the least the process of her construction doesn’t really make sense. The cost of her construction has never been disclosed as well. What is known is that she weighed 19,828 GRT and sat at a length of 182.58 m or 598.9 ft long. And she was built to achieve a top speed on 23.8 knots (44.1 km/h; 27.4 mph). Here is the next confusing part. Many sources say Antilles was fitted with a diesel powered propulsion system. This is odd as she has the title of “S.S.” Which directly tells you that she was a steam powered ship. She also most likely was driven along by steam turbines just like SS Flandre, that were oil fired.

== Career and Wrecking ==
During her career she served the Caribbean route all year by herself, until SS Flandre was put on the route during the winter months after jet travel rose in the late 1950s early 1960s. But her career was much shorter than her sister's. Lasting from 1953 to 1971. Then on the January 8, 1971, she struck a reef near the island of Mustique in the Grenadines while attempting to navigate Lansecoy Bay, a shallow and reef-filled bay on the northern side of Mustique. The reason Antilles′ captain decided to sail into the narrow, shallow strait was to give the passengers a better view of the island. But upon hitting the rocks the impact ruptured a fuel tank and she caught fire. All of her passengers and crew evacuated the ship safely to the island of Mustique and they were rescued by the Cunard Line′s Queen Elizabeth 2.

The burnt-out hulk could not be freed from the reef, so the ship lay there for several months, eventually breaking in half. Many years later after the wreck had decayed and collapsed due to the elements she would be partially scrapped on spot (as she was considered an eye sore to the residents of Mustique) and moved just a few hundred yards to her final resting place in the channel off Lansecoy Bay.

The wreck site is submerged off Mustique and is barely visible on Google Earth at 12°54′04″N 061°10′44″W. A small section of the port side hull towards the stern is still visible, while everything else is below the surface. Although the ship wrecked on a reef, reaching the site is dangerous because of the rip tides that form in the area so the wreck is rarely dived these days. Supposedly, an 80ft salvage tug lies near the wreck, it’s speculated it was involved in a failed salvage attempt.

== Popular culture ==
Either Flandre or Antilles appeared in stock footage in the 1964 Perry Mason television episode "Nautical Knot", set near Acapulco, Mexico. The scenes on board were filmed on a studio set. P&O's equally popular SS Arcadia also appears in the episode. SS Antilles is also featured in the Danish movie "Hvor er liget, Møller?"

Triang also made a model of Antilles for their Minic ships line in the 1960s while she was still in service.
