= SS Flandre (1951) =

Ocean liner and cruise ship

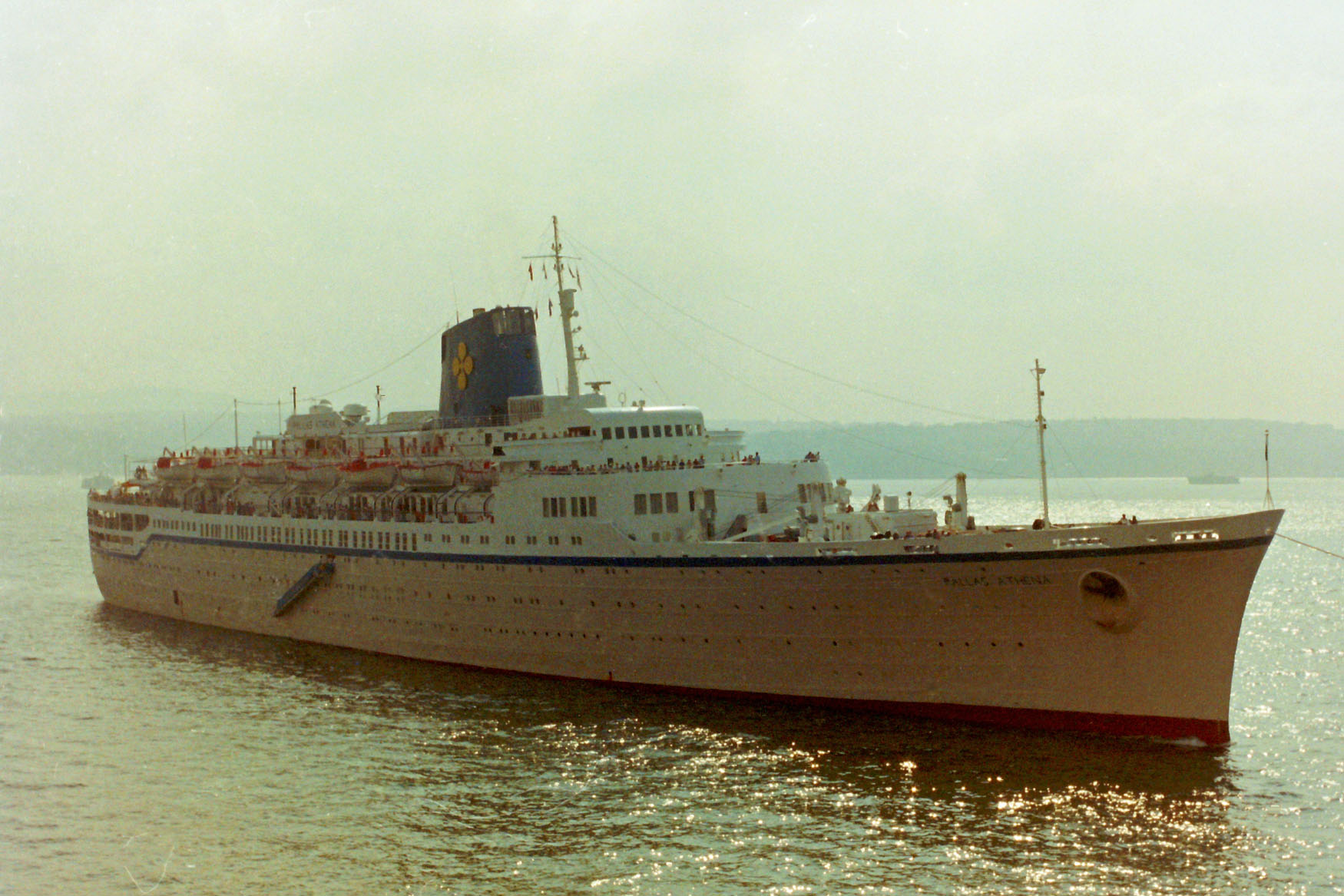
- The ship as Pallas Athena in 1992

History
- Name: Flandre (1952–1968); Carla C (1968–1986); Carla Costa (1986–1992); Pallas Athena (1992−1994)
- Operator: CGT (1951–1967); Costa Cruises (1967–1992); Epirotiki Line (1992–1994)
- Port of registry: 1952–1968: (France) Le Havre; 1968–1983: (Italy) Genoa; 1983–1992: (Italy) Naples; 1992–1994: Panama City
- Builder: A&C de France, Dunkirk
- Yard number: 206
- Launched: 31 October 1951
- Completed: 1952
- Maiden voyage: 23 July 1952
- Identification: IMO number: 5116098; Call sign FNRY (1952–68)
- Fate: Destroyed by fire 23 March 1994

General characteristics
- Type: Ocean liner
- Tonnage: 1953: 20,469 GRT, 10,353 NRT
- Length: 581.6 ft (177.3 m)
- Beam: 80.2 ft (24.4 m)
- Depth: 43.7 ft (13.3 m)
- Decks: 6
- Installed power: 8 steam turbines (1951–75); Diesels (1975–94)
- Propulsion: 2 propellers
- Speed: 22 knots (41 km/h; 25 mph)

Flandre, later called Carla C, Carla Costa, and Pallas Athena, was an ocean liner and cruise ship that took passengers on transatlantic voyages and on Caribbean and Mediterranean cruises from 1952 to 1994. She was operated by the Compagnie Générale Transatlantique (CGT), Costa Cruises, and the Epirotiki Line.

== Building ==
Ateliers et Chantiers de France built her in Dunkirk as yard number 206. She was launched on 31 October 1951 and completed in 1952. Her registered length was 581.6 ft (177.3 m), her beam was 80.2 ft (24.4 m) and her depth was 43.7 ft (13.3 m). As built, her tonnages were 20,469 GRT and 10,353 NRT.

Flandre had twin screws. Ateliers et Chantiers de Bretagne built her original engines, which were two sets of steam turbines, four driving each screw.

CGT registered Flandre at Le Havre. Her call sign was FNRY.

== Career ==
=== CGT ===
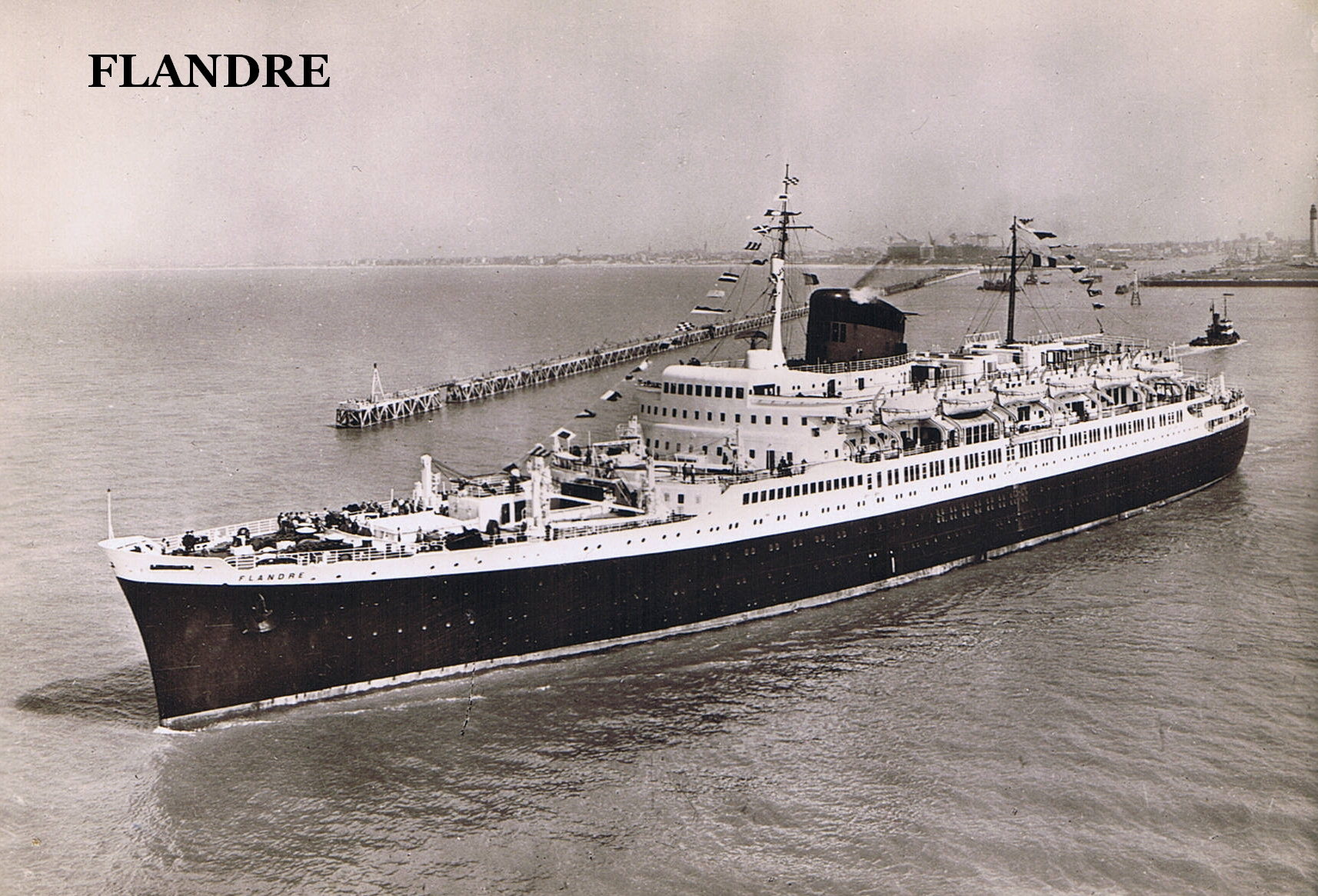
Flandre at sea

Flandre was the CGT's first new ocean liner since World War II. She began her maiden voyage on 23 July 1952. It was considered a failure, as she suffered mechanical failures throughout the voyage. First, impurities in her bunker oil clogged her fuel lines. This rendered her essentially "dead in the water" for four hours while her fuel filters were cleaned out and her boiler furnaces restored to normal. This was repeated later in the voyage, after which Flandre's captain chose to reduce speed for the remainder of the voyage.

On arrival at the Quarantine Station at New York, she suffered a short circuit in her main electrical switchboard causing a near-complete loss of power. Nearly three hours later, she had enough power restored to raise her port anchor. A further three hours were required to raise the starboard anchor for her to continue.

Unlike most ocean liners' maiden arrivals, where they receive the traditional fireboat welcome while sailing under their own power, Flandre arrived in New York Harbor and received the traditional welcome while under tow by four Moran tugs, and running only one of her own twin propellers. Her funnel put out thick clouds of smoke, seeming to almost be straining as it was doing so. She was initially blowing her whistle as she arrived under tow, but after the whistle failed due to her limited power, the ship's siren was substituted. This lacklustre arrival garnered her the nickname "Flounder" by Manhattan dockers.

Flandre's return voyage was delayed to allow engineers to repair her engines. Following her return to France, all of her 1952 sailings were cancelled, and she returned to her builders for thorough repairs. Repairs would take six months, and she returned for the 1953 sailing season.

In her CGT career, her passenger configuration was changed several times, with Flandre running on the transatlantic route for nine months out of the year, and three months cruising with her near-sister Antilles. In 1967, she was withdrawn completely, and was sold to the Italian firm Costa Cruises, who renamed her Carla C.

=== Costa Cruises ===
The first assignment for the newly refitted Carla C was a charter for Princess Cruises, which marketed her as "Princess Carla" (the ship was not renamed). It was at this time that a set of producers originated the idea of the popular television-series The Love Boat aboard Carla C. Consequently, the first scripts were written on board the ship.

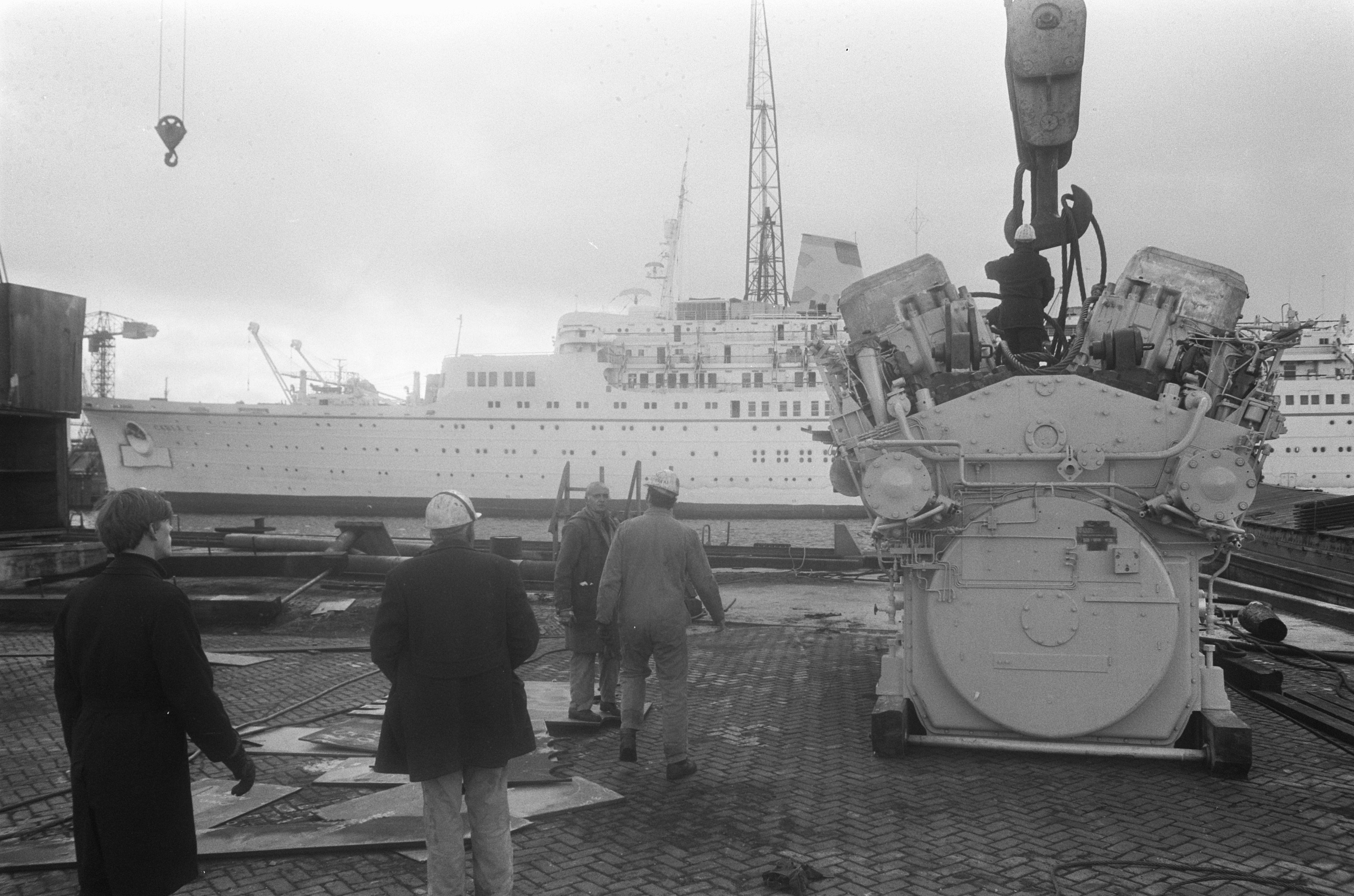
Carla C being re-engined at Amsterdam, October 1974.

The ship proved problematic at first, after problems were found with the boilers. In 1974 and 1975, Costa replaced the boilers with Stork-Werkspoor diesel engines and Carla C was returned to service around the Caribbean, where she served until 1992.

In 1984, the ship underwent another major refit, to ensure safe travel for its passengers for many years to come. In 1986, Carla C was renamed Carla Costa. No other changes occurred with the name change.

Carla Costa was a common sight on the San Juan ship dock on Saturdays in that era, and her regularly scheduled route included Curaçao, Caracas, Grenada, Martinique, and Saint Thomas, U.S. Virgin Islands.

=== Epirotiki Line ===
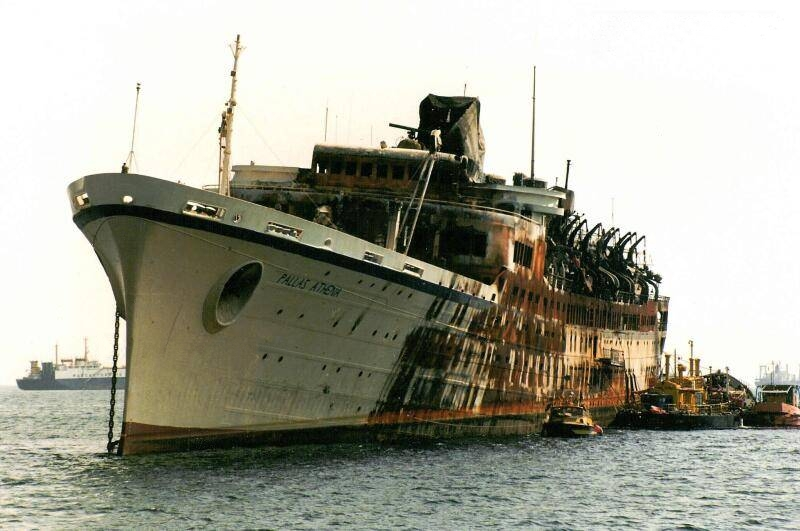
Pallas Athena laid up in Perama Bay in 1994 after its fire.

In 1992, Carla Costa was sold to the Greek Epirotiki Line, and renamed Pallas Athena, after the Greek goddess Pallas Athene. For the Epirotiki Line, she ran seven-day cruises from Athens to the Aegean Islands and Turkey. On 23 March 1994, Pallas Athena was destroyed by fire, which caused the superstructure and funnel to cave in on itself. She arrived at the Aliaga Company scrapyards on 25 December 1994, one of only two surviving CGT ocean liners.

=== In popular culture ===
Flandre or Antilles appeared as stock footage in the 1964 Perry Mason episode Nautical Knot, set near Acapulco, Mexico. The scenes on board were filmed on a studio set. P&O's equally popular SS Arcadia also appears in the episode.
