= SS La Provence =

Ocean liner launched in 1905

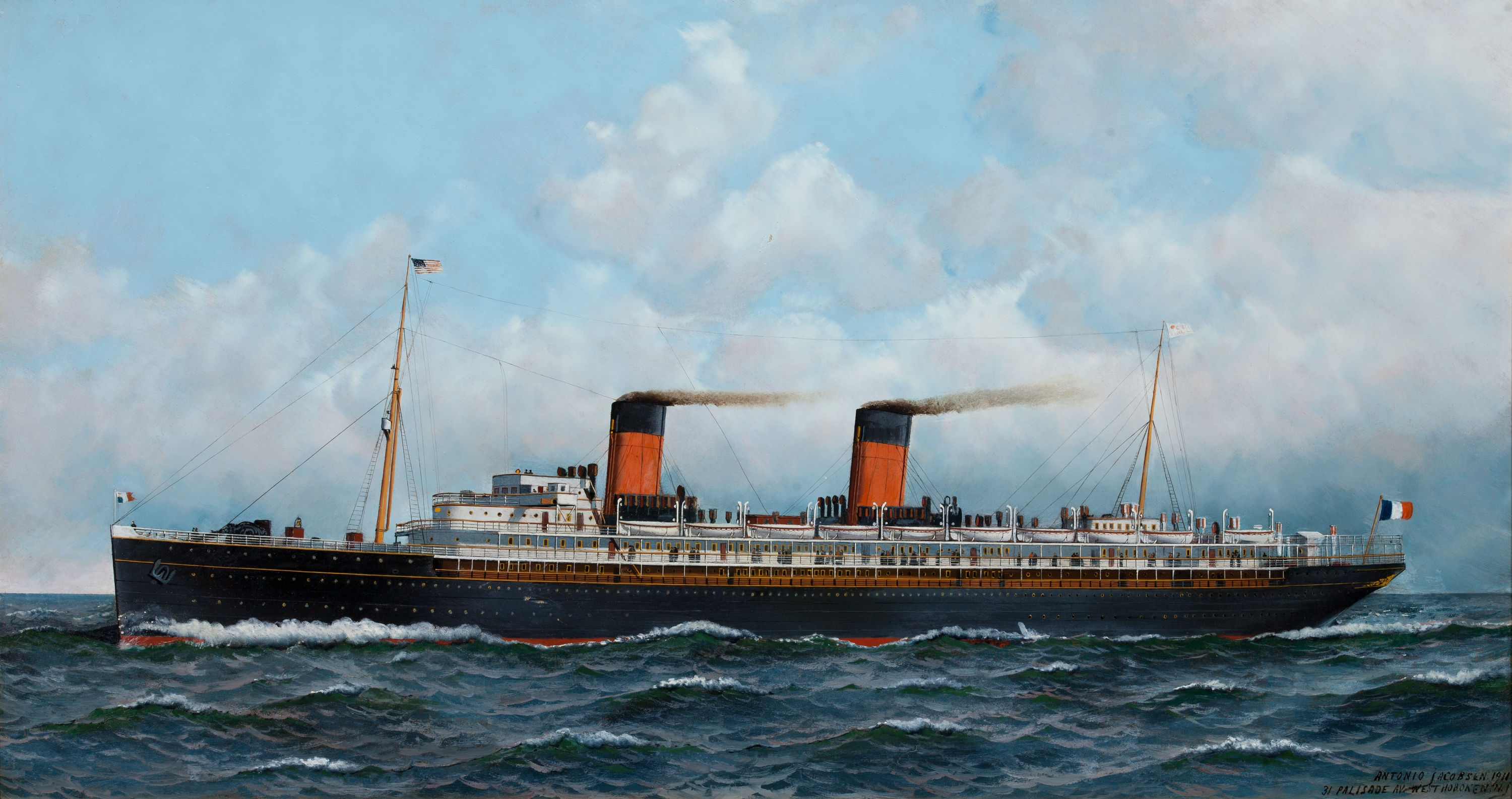
- SS La Provence in a painting by Antonio Jacobsen

History

France
- Name: La Provence
- Owner: Compagnie Generale Transatlantique
- Builder: Chantiers de Penhoët, Saint-Nazaire
- Laid down: December 1903
- Launched: 21 March 1905
- Completed: 1905
- Fate: Sunk, 26 February 1916

General characteristics
- Type: Ocean liner
- Tonnage: 13,753 GRT
- Length: 191 m (626 ft 8 in) LOA
- Beam: 19.8 m (65 ft 0 in)
- Draught: 8.15 m (26 ft 9 in)
- Depth: 12.7 m (41 ft 8 in) amidships
- Installed power: 30,000 ihp (22,000 kW)
- Propulsion: 2 x triple expansion steam engines
- Speed: 23 knots (43 km/h; 26 mph)
- Capacity: 397 first class, 205 second class and 900 third class passengers
- Crew: 435

SS La Provence was an ocean liner and auxiliary cruiser torpedoed and sunk in the Mediterranean Sea on 26 February 1916. She belonged to the French Compagnie Générale Transatlantique.

When launched on 21 March 1905 in a ceremony attended by the Ministers of Public Works and Commerce along with the First Secretary of Marine, La Provence was the largest ship in the French merchant marine and the largest built in France.

== La Provence ==
La Provence was 191 metres (626 ft 8 in) long overall with a 19.8-metre (65 ft 0 in) beam and, at design draught of 8.15 metres (26 ft 9 in), limited for the relatively shallow harbor of Le Havre from which the ship was to operate, displaced 19,190 metric tons (18,890 long tons) or 18,870 gross register tons (GRT). A proposal to power the ship with steam turbines was rejected and two conventional triple expansion steam engines chosen instead driving two screws with 30,000 indicated horsepower (22,000 kW) for an expected speed of 23 knots (43 km/h; 26 mph). Four steam driven dynamos supplied electric power. The ship was designed with accommodation for 397 first class, 205 second class and 900 third class passengers served by 435 crew members for a total of 1,937 persons.

The ship operated on the Le Havre—New York route, making one crossing in six days and four hours for an average of 21.63 knots (40.06 km/h; 24.89 mph).

== Armed merchant cruiser Provence II ==
The ship was taken over by the French government to become the French Navy's Provence II, an armed merchant cruiser that was converted to a troopship in order to support the Gallipoli Campaign and Macedonian campaign in World War I. Provence II was transporting troops from France to Salonika when she was sunk by the German U-boat U-35 commanded by Lothar von Arnauld de la Perière south of Cape Matapan. The ship listed so quickly that many of the lifeboats could not be used. There were 742 survivors. Nearly 1,000 people were killed in the sinking.

Contemporary reports from Paris indicated nearly 4,000 persons aboard and 3,130 lives lost. Modern accounts of losses revise those numbers downward to about 1,700 troops aboard and under 1,000 lost. The wartime reports from Paris for losses in this one sinking are quite close to the total, 3,180, for three troop ships sunk in connection with the Salonika troop movements: Provence II, Gallia (October 1916) and Amiral Magon (January 1917).

The Sydney Morning Herald for 8 March 1916, and several other English-language papers, reported:

M. Bokanowski, a French Deputy, who is one of the survivors of the French auxiliary cruiser Provence, which was torpedoed and sunk in the Mediterranean, narrates that a battalion of the Third Colonial Infantry was aboard. There was no lamentation, and there was no panic, though the ship was sinking rapidly and the boilers exploding.

Captain Vesco, he states, remained on the bridge, calmly giving orders, and finally cried, "Adieu, mes enfants." The men clustered on the foredeck, and replied, "Vive la France." Then the Provence made a sudden plunge, and the foredeck rose perpendicularly above the water.

A British patrol and a French torpedo boat picked up the survivors after they had been 18 hours in the water. Many died or went mad before the rescue ships arrived.

== See also ==
- List by death toll of ships sunk by submarines
- List of ocean liners

== Bibliography ==
- Antioch News (1916). "3,130 Lost on Ship". The Antioch News. XXIX (March 9, 1916). A. B. Johnson, Antioch, Illinois.
- Dunn, R. C. C. (1941). "An R.A.F. Bomb Killed Germany's U-Boat Leader". The Argus—Weekend Magazine (5 April 1941). The Argus, Perth, West Australia.
- Peltier, J. (1905). "The Launch of the New French Liner La Provence". Marine Engineering. 10 (May 1905). New York: Marine Engineering, Inc.
- Ramakers, L. (1905). "New Passenger Steamer La Provence". Marine Engineering. 10 (August 1905). New York: Marine Engineering, Inc.
- Smith, Eugene W. (1947). Trans-Atlantic Passenger Ships Past and Present. LCCN 47006048.
- Wise, James E.; Baron, Scott (2004). Soldiers Lost at Sea. Annapolis, Md.: Naval Institute Press. ISBN 1591149665. LCCN 2003009755.
