= SS De Grasse =

Ocean liner (1924–1962)

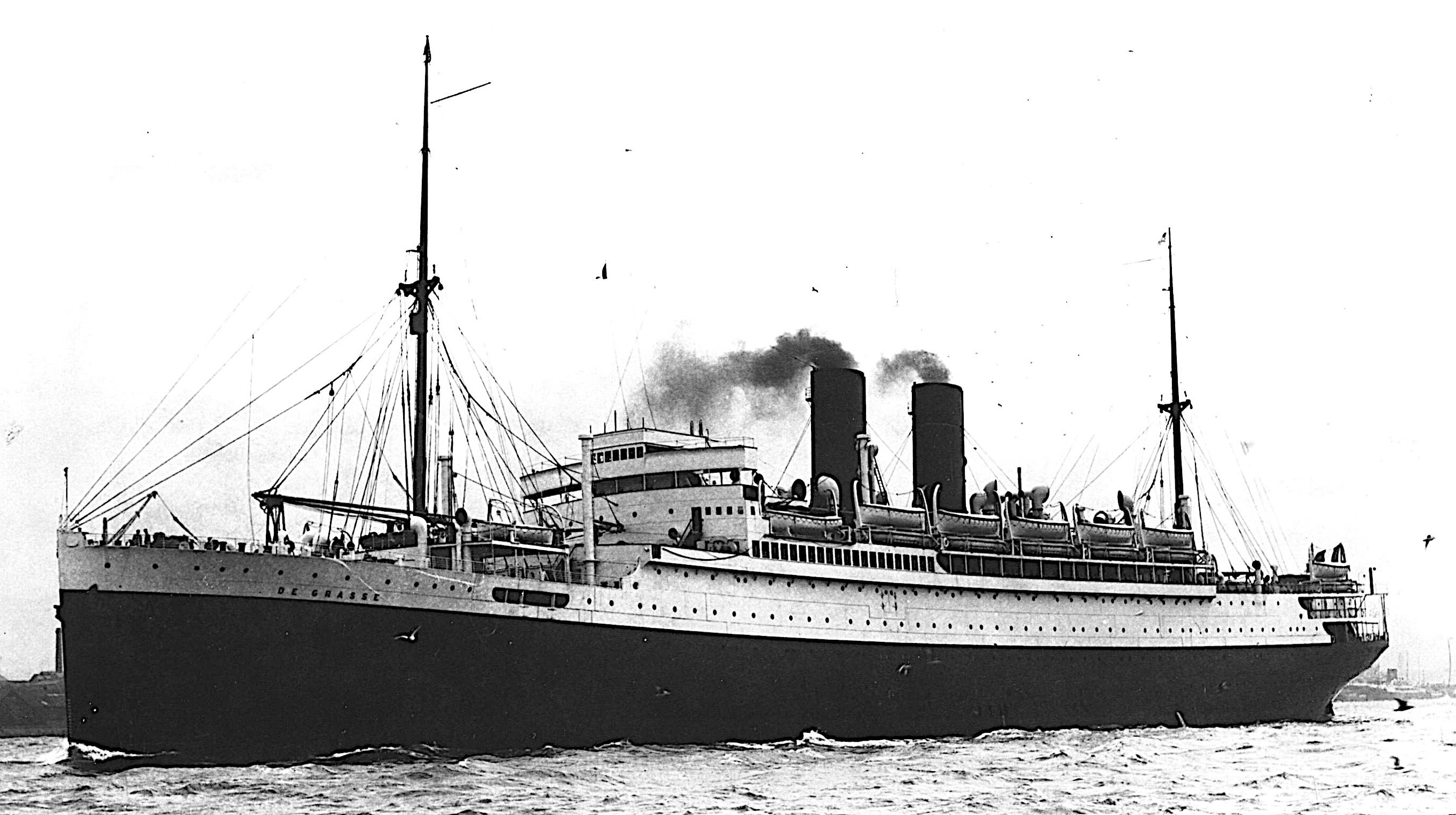
- De Grasse departing port

History
- Name: 1924–1953: SS De Grasse; 1953-1956: RMS Empress of Australia; 1956-1962: SS Venezuela
- Owner: 1924: CGT; 1953: Canadian Pacific Railway; 1956: Sicula Oceanica
- Operator: 1953–1956: CP Steamships
- Port of registry: 1924: (France) Le Havre; 1953: (United Kingdom) London; 1956: (Italy) Palermo
- Route: 1924: Le Havre – New York
- Builder: Cammell Laird, Birkenhead
- Yard number: 886
- Laid down: 23 March 1920
- Launched: 23 February 1924
- Completed: August 1924
- Maiden voyage: 21 August 1924
- In service: 1924
- Out of service: 1962
- Identification: Until 1933: code letters OUVX; By 1934: call sign FNRR; 1953: UK official number 185887; 1953: call sign GQMQ; 1956: call sign IBVW
- Fate: Sank after ran aground, before scrap in 1962

General characteristics
- Type: Ocean liner
- Tonnage: 1924: 17,759 GRT; 1932: 18,359 GRT; 1947: 18,435 GRT
- Length: 552.1 ft (168.3 m)
- Beam: 71.4 ft (21.8 m)
- Depth: 42.3 ft (12.9 m)
- Decks: 4
- Propulsion: 4 × steam turbines; single-reduction gearing; 2 × screws
- Speed: 17 knots (31 km/h; 20 mph)

SS De Grasse was a transatlantic liner built in 1921 by Cammell Laird, Birkenhead, United Kingdom for Compagnie Générale Transatlantique, and launched in February 1924. In August 1924 De Grasse set sail on her maiden voyage from Le Havre to New York. After the fall of France to Nazi Germany, the ship was used as a barracks ship. Sunk at Bordeaux, France, during the German retreat, she was refloated, repaired, and put back into service. Over the years, she became Empress of Australia and then Venezuela. She ran aground off Cannes, France, in 1962 and was scrapped at La Spezia, Italy.

== History ==
=== CGT ===
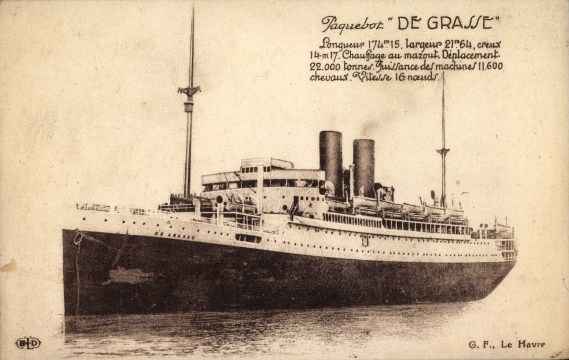
Postcard of De Grasse as built, with two funnels (1924–1947)

Originally speculated ordered under the name Suffren, the ship was renamed after the Compagnie Générale Transatlantique (CGT) acquired the Brazilian ship Leopoldina. De Grasse was put into service in August 1924 between Le Havre and New York. It was modernized in 1931.

At the start of World War II, it continued its crossings, but in a slightly militarized version (blocked portholes, light armament). In the spring of 1940, it was transformed into a troop transport. The ship was decommissioned in May 1940 at Bordeaux. It was then used as a floating barracks ship for German soldiers and then as a base ship for Italian submariners (Italy had based more than twenty submarines at Bordeaux to support the Germans during the Battle of the Atlantic). Appearing as too dangerous a target after the first British bombardment on Bordeaux, the ship surrendered to the Vichy government in May 1942, which used it as a training ship.

The Germans partly sank it during their retreat in August 1944. It was refloated in August 1945 and sent to the Penhoët shipyards to be repaired and modernized (it lost a funnel during these transformations). The ship was reassigned to the Le Havre to New York route while the CGT reconstituted a fleet.

=== Canadian Pacific ===
As RMS Empress of Australia

In 1953, De Grasse was sold to Canadian Pacific Steamships and renamed Empress of Australia, operating as a replacement for the RMS Empress of Canada, which had caught fire and capsized earlier that year. However, she did not serve Canadian Pacific for long as in 1956 the ship was sold to the Italian company Sicula Oceanica.

=== Sicula Oceanica ===
In 1956, Empress of Australia was sold to Sicula Oceanica, and after a refit, the ship was renamed Venezuela and served the Naples to the Caribbean route. She had an uneventful career with her new owner. In 1962, Venezuela was wrecked off Cannes. She was refloated but was broken up at La Spezia, Italy in August of the same year.

== Notable passengers ==
In 1924 De Grasse transported British actor Arthur Margetson and his wife Rosamund on its maiden voyage from Le Havre, arriving in New York on 5 September.

On 10th February 1926, Ayn Rand boarded De Grasse in Le Havre, arriving in New York on 19th February.

In April 1930 De Grasse transported Arturo Toscanini and the 114 members of the New York Philharmonic Orchestra from New York City to Le Havre on the outbound leg of the orchestra's first European tour.

In 1949, Jacqueline Bouvier travelled aboard De Grasse on a study abroad trip to Paris.

== See also ==
- List of ocean liners
