= SS Espagne (Provence, 1909) =

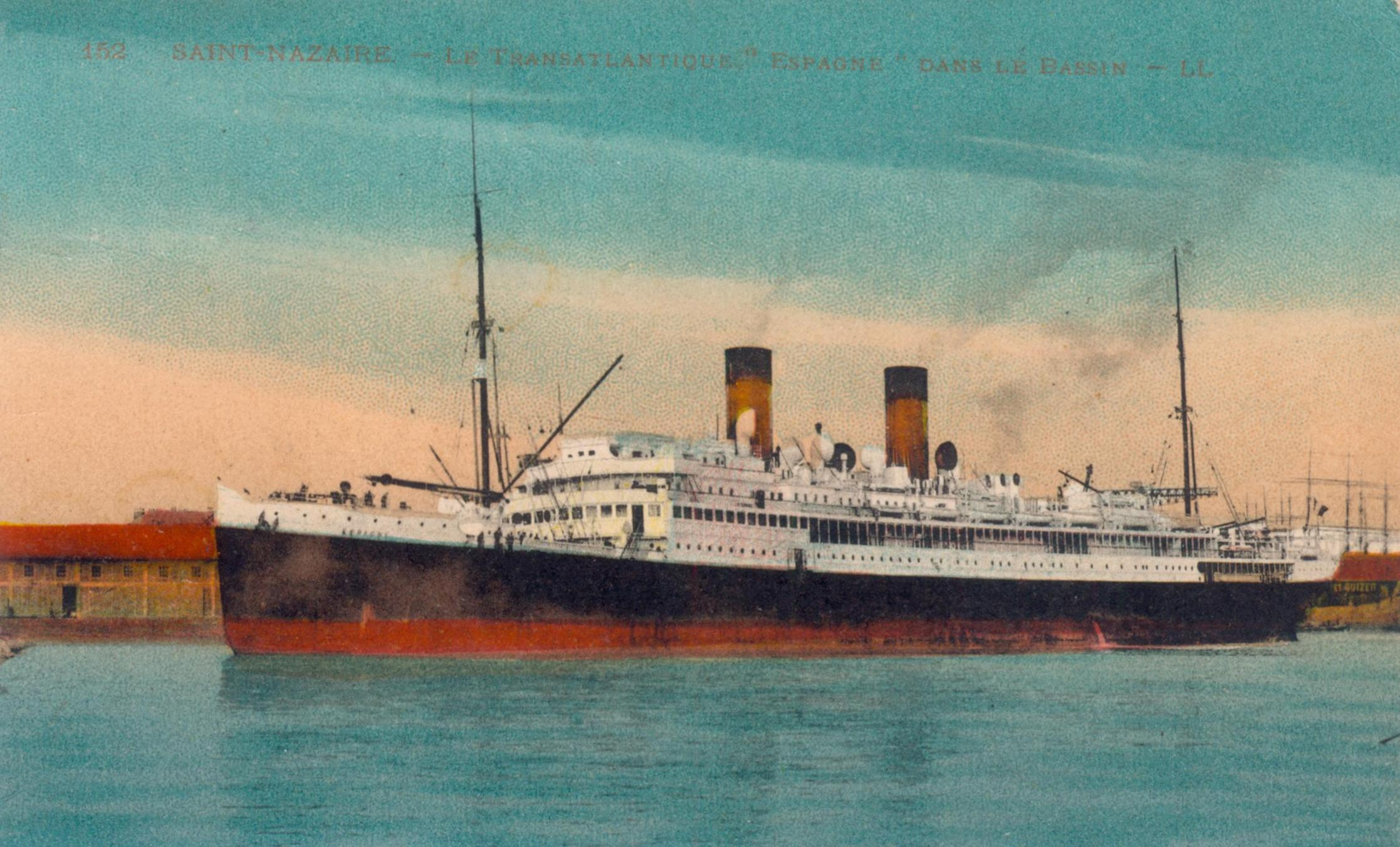
- Espagne

History

France
- Name: Espagne
- Namesake: Spain
- Owner: Compagnie Générale Transatlantique
- Port of registry: Le Havre, France
- Ordered: 29 May 1908
- Builder: Chantiers & Ateliers de Provence
- Yard number: 30
- Launched: 19 December 1909
- In service: October 1910
- Out of service: June 1932
- Identification: Code Letters OGPR
- Fate: Scrapped May 1934

General characteristics
- Type: Ocean liner
- Tonnage: 11,155 GRT, 5,659 NRT, 4,467 DWT
- Length: 537 feet 8 inches (163.88 m)
- Beam: 60 feet 8 inches (18.49 m)
- Depth: 39 feet 0 inches (11.89 m)
- Installed power: Two 4-cylinder triple expansion steam engines, 1,376 NHP
- Propulsion: Twin screw propellers
- Speed: 18 knots (33 km/h)

Espagne was an 11,155 GRT ocean liner which was built in 1909–10 for Compagnie Générale Transatlantique. She served as a troopship during World War I and was in service until 1932, and was scrapped in 1934.

== Design ==
Espagne was ordered from Chantiers & Ateliers de Provence, Port de Bouc, Bouches-du-Rhône on 29 May 1908 as Yard No.30 for Compagnie Générale Transatlantique. She was 537 feet 8 inches (163.88 m) long, with a beam of 60 feet 8 inches (18.49 m) and a depth of 39 feet 0 inches (11.89 m). She was assessed at 11,155 GRT, 5,659 NRT, 4,467 DWT. The ship was powered by two 4-cylinder triple expansion steam engines. The engines had cylinders of 33 1/2 inches (85 cm), 53 15/16 inches (137 cm) and two of 66 13/16 inches (170 cm) diameter by 59 inches (150 cm) stroke. The engine was built by Chantiers & Ateliers de Provence. Rated at 1,376 NHP, they could propel the ship at 18 knots (33 km/h) with her twin screw propellers.

== History ==
Espagne was the only transatlantic ocean liner built by Chantiers & Ateliers de Provence. Launched on 19 December 1909, she was completed in October 1910. Her port of registry was Le Havre and the Code Letters OGPR were allocated.

Espagne served on routes to Central America and the West Indies. In April 1911, she was chartered as a troopship along with Aquitaine and Moulouya to transport 2,700 troops from Marseille, France, Algiers, Bône and Philippeville, Algeria to Constantinople, Ottoman Empire. In September 1911, she developed a leak on arrival at Santander, Spain and was taken to Le Havre for repairs. In mid-1912, she was used on the Le Havre – New York route. Following the Tampico Affair, Espagne transported 100 refugees from Puerto Mexico to Veracruz, Mexico.

Espagne returned to the Le Havre – New York route from mid-1914. She transferred to the Bordeaux – New York route in 1915. In February 1916, American passengers booked to travel on Espagne received anonymous letters telling them not to. From 1916–20, she served as a troopship. Espagne returned to the Central American and Caribbean routes in 1920. In 1926, a decree was issued in Mexico that all priests had to be born there. A number of Spanish priests were arrested and deported. Fourteen of them travelled on Espagne from Veracruz to a Spanish port in February 1926. On 20 August 1926, she struck a rock off A Coruña, Spain and damaged one of her propellers. Espagne served until June 1932, when she was laid up. She was scrapped at Saint-Nazaire, Loire-Atlantique in May 1934, by the company M. Glotz.
