= SS Pasteur =

French-built ocean liner, later cruise ship

Coordinates: 07°35′N 60°12′E

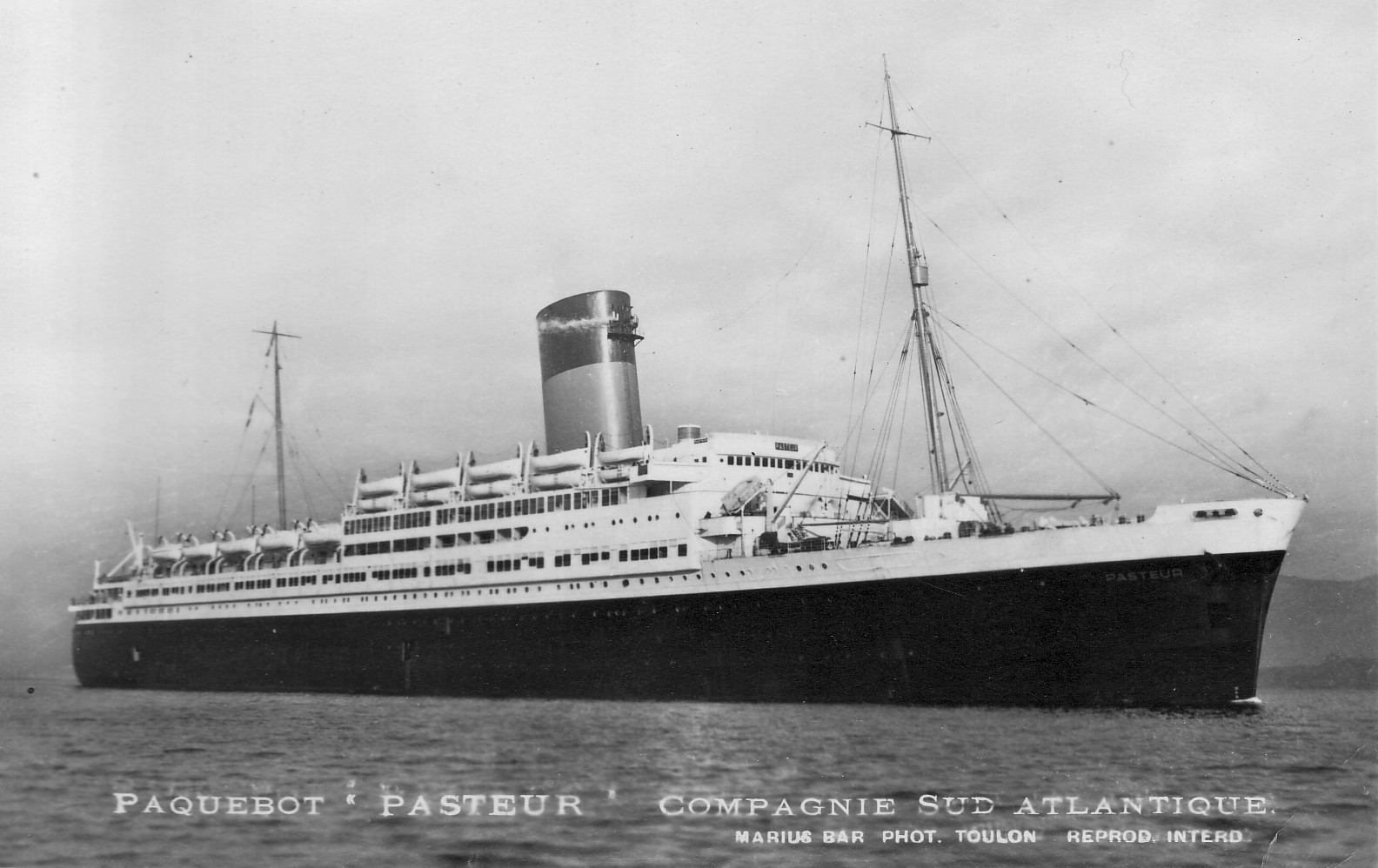
- SS Pasteur

History
- Name: Pasteur (1939–57); Bremen (1957–72); Regina Magna (1972–77); Saudiphil I (1977–80); Filipinas Saudi I (1980)
- Namesake: Louis Pasteur; Bremen
- Owner: Compagnie de Navigation Sud-Atlantique (1938–40); UK Government (1940–46); Compagnie de Navigation Sud-Atlantique (1946–57); Norddeutscher Lloyd (1957–72); Chandris Cruises (1972–77); Philippine Singapore Ports Corporation (1977–80); Philsimport International (1980)
- Operator: Compagnie de Navigation Sud-Atlantique (1938–40); Cunard-White Star Line (1940–46); Compagnie de Navigation Sud-Atlantique (1946–56); Norddeutscher Lloyd (1957–72); Chandris Cruises (1972–77); Philippine Singapore Ports Corporation (1977–80); Philsimport International (1980)
- Port of registry: (France) Bordeaux (1938–40); (United Kingdom) Liverpool (1940–46); France (1946–57); West Germany (1957–72); Greece (1972–77); (Saudi Arabia) Jeddah (1977–80); Philippines (1980)
- Route: France – South America (1938–40); Canada, South Africa, Australia and South America (1940–46); Bremerhaven - Southampton - Cherbourg - New York (1959-71)
- Builder: Chantiers de l'Atlantique
- Yard number: R8
- Launched: 15 February 1938
- Christened: 15 February 15, 1938 by Madame Pasteur Vallery-Radot, wife of the grandson of Louis Pasteur
- Completed: August 1939
- Commissioned: 1940
- Decommissioned: 1980
- Out of service: 1956–57; 1974
- Refit: 1957–59; 1965–66; 1972
- Identification: UK Official Number 166306 (1940–46); call sign FNDC (1938–40); call sign GNDW (1940–46); IMO number: 5051145
- Honours and awards: Croix de Guerre
- Fate: Sank in Indian Ocean on June 8th 1980 while being towed to Taiwanese ship breakers.

General characteristics
- Type: Ocean liner (1939-40); Troopship and hospital ship (1940–45); Troopship (1945–46); Ocean liner and cruise ship (1956–72); Cruise ship (1972–74); Accommodation ship (1974–77); Floating hotel (1977–80)
- Tonnage: 29,253 GRT (Pasteur); 32,336 GRT (Bremen, 1957); 32,360 GRT (Bremen, 1966); 23,801 GRT (Regina Magna)
- Length: 212.4 m (696 ft 10 in)
- Beam: 26.8 m (87 ft 11 in)
- Decks: 11 decks
- Installed power: Three 1,375 KVA generator had an output of 6,600 Kilowatt.
- Propulsion: Strongest power could be generated: 50,000 HP, which powered quadruple propellers (Pasteur); 53,000 HP powering four propellers (Bremen)
- Speed: Top speed: 26 knots (48 km/h; 30 mph); Service speed: 22 knots (41 km/h; 25 mph) (Pasteur); 26 knots (48 km/h; 30 mph); Service speed: 23 knots (43 km/h; 26 mph) (Bremen)
- Capacity: 751 passengers: 1,122, 287, or 275 in 1st class; 126 in 2nd class; 338 in 3rd class (Pasteur); Load-carrying capacity: 8,700 tdw Maximum passenger capacity: 14,000 (Bremen)
- Crew: 540 (Pasteur)

SS Pasteur was a steam turbine ocean liner built for Compagnie de Navigation Sud-Atlantique. She later sailed as Bremen for Norddeutscher Lloyd. In the course of her career, she sailed for 41 years under four names and six countries' flags.

== Construction ==
In 1933 Compagnie de Navigation Sud-Atlantique's modern 42,512 GRT flagship L'Atlantique was gutted by fire after only two years in service. After a three-year dispute her underwriters agreed she was beyond economic repair and paid her owners a settlement.

With the settlement, her owners ordered Pasteur as a smaller but faster replacement ship to carry passengers and freight on their South Atlantic routes. Her main competition was the German liner Cap Arcona, owned by the Hamburg Südamerikanische Dampfschifffahrts-Gesellschaft. She was also designed to compete with a new British ship, RMS Andes, which Harland and Wolff was building for Royal Mail Lines.

Chantiers de l'Atlantique in Saint-Nazaire began work on Pasteur in 1938. On 15 February of that year she was launched as Pasteur after the scientist Louis Pasteur. A fire in March 1939 delayed her fitting out and she was not completed until August 1939, just before World War II broke out.

Pasteur had a tonnage of 29,253 gross register tons. She was 212.4 m long and 26.8 m wide. She had 11 decks and possessed extensive loading spaces. She was designed to carry 751 passengers. She could develop about 50,000 HP and speeds up to 26 knots (48 km/h; 30 mph) but her usual service speed was about 22 knots (41 km/h; 25 mph). Her draught was 9.3 m. She had four propellers.

== History ==
The outbreak of World War II delayed the deployment of Pasteur, and she was laid up in Saint-Nazaire in France. In 1940, she was commissioned to carry 200 tons of gold reserves from Brest, France to Halifax, Nova Scotia. Her official maiden voyage from Bordeaux to Buenos Aires was cancelled due to the outbreak of war. After the fall of France to Germany, she was taken over by the Great Britain government and placed under Cunard-White Star management. She was used as a troop transport and military hospital ship between Canada, South Africa, Australia and South America, and transported around 300,000 soldiers. She was sometimes called HMTS Pasteur.

=== World War II ===
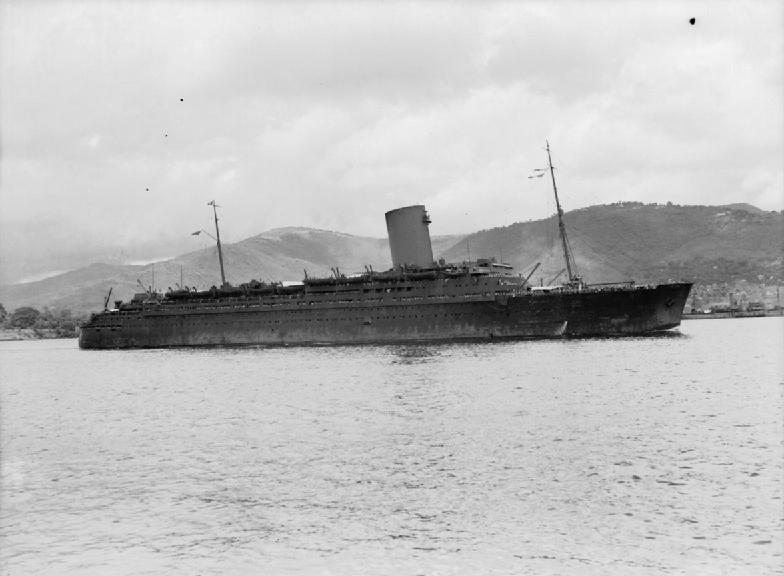
Pasteur in wartime on Convoy WS19

Due to her speed, Pasteur normally made her crossings alone and unescorted rather than as part of a convoy. She made one voyage from Glasgow to Halifax with a mixed complement of troops, including officers arranging the transport of 20,000 British troops across Canada and the Pacific to Singapore in October, 1941. She also carried almost 2,000 German prisoners to prisoner of war camps in North America. In addition, she transported prisoners from Suez, Egypt to South Africa. In 1943, she visited Freetown, Cape Town, Durban, Aden and Port Tewfik, and then back to the Clyde and Halifax. She carried 10,000 troops of the British 8th Army Corps and 5,000 US 1st Army Corps troops to the battle of Alamein. Altogether, she carried 220,000 troops, and 30,000 wounded, and traveled 370,669 miles during the war.

=== Post-war ===
After the war, Pasteur was used to repatriate US and Canadian troops then returned to her owners in October 1945. Management was returned to Cie Sudatlantique in early 1946. After her return to France in 1946, she remained in French military service as troop transporter. She carried French troops to Vietnam (First Indochina War), and then to Algeria between 1954 and 1957. She was awarded France's highest honor, the Croix de Guerre. In February 1950, she made one voyage bringing 4,000 Dutch troops from Indonesia to the Netherlands.

=== Acquired by North German Lloyd ===
Pasteur was laid up at Toulon in 1956 and then at Brest in 1957. During the Suez Canal affair, the ship was commissioned again in September 1956 along with other passenger and military ships to be a troop transport. While she was docked in Port Said harbor in December 1956, the HQ General of the French troops was on board. At the end of the war, Pasteur was one of the last Allied ships to leave Port Said. She was sold to North German Lloyd for 30 million DM in September 1957. The transfer of ownership from Brest to Bremerhaven took place in September 1957.

=== Refit ===
After being acquired by North German Lloyd and renamed TS Bremen in 1957, she was extensively rebuilt at Bremer Vulkan in Bremen for approximately 65 million DM. Her size was increased to 32,336 GRT and the load-carrying capacity with 8,700 tdw. She received new boilers and four steam turbines with a maximum output of 60,000 HP giving her a maximum speed of 26 knots (48 km/h). Economical output of 53,500 HP gave a speed of 23 knots (43 km/h). Three 1,375 KVA generators had an output of 6,600 kilowatt. One very noticeable change was the new drop-shaped funnel, which was much more in proportion with the ship than the original tall funnel. To enhance comfort, two 4.5 m Stabilizers were fitted. In June 1959 she underwent new sea trials.

=== German service ===
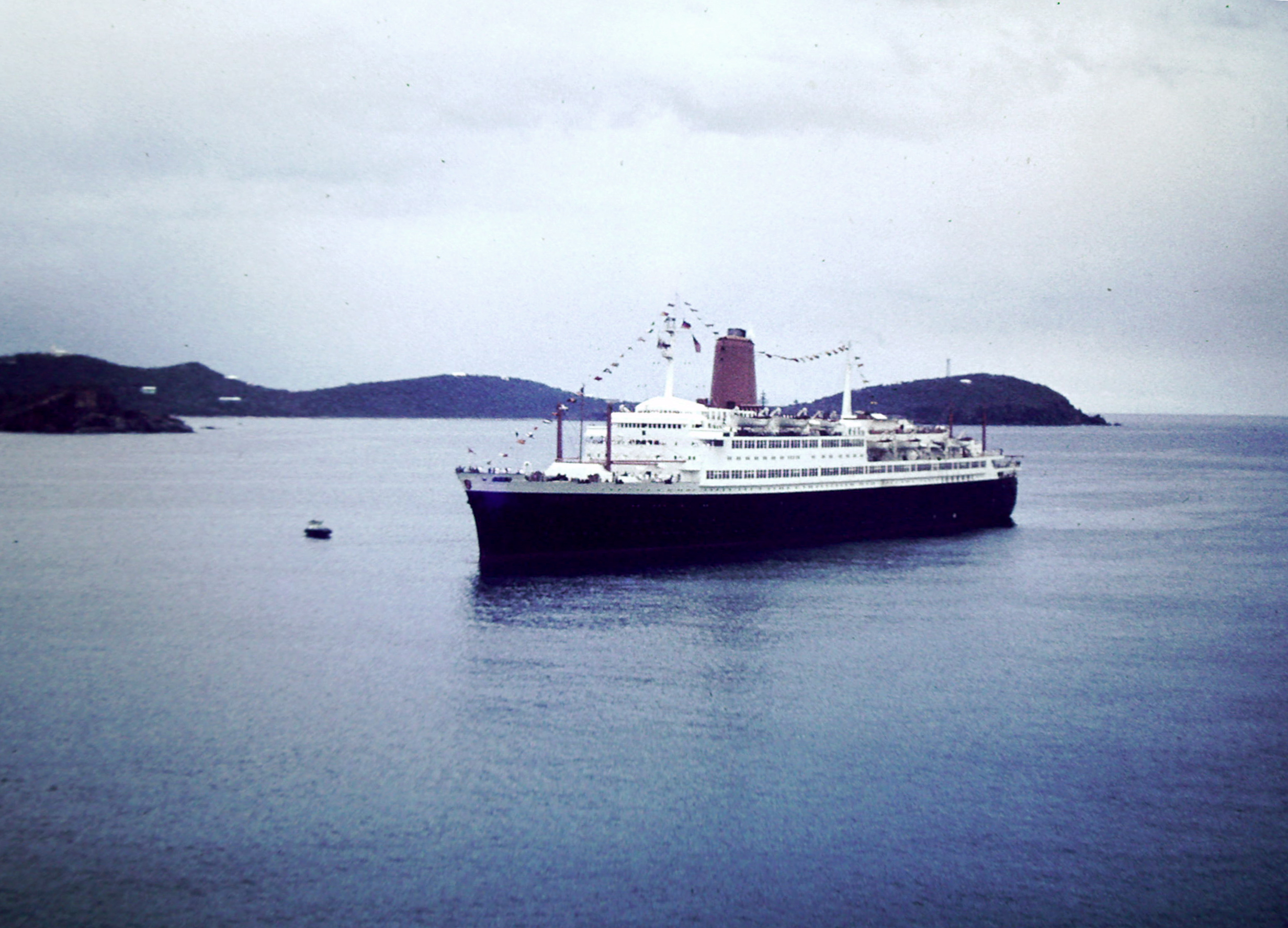
Bremen at Saint Thomas Island in the spring of 1968

On July 9, 1959, she was placed on the Bremerhaven – Southampton – Cherbourg – New York City route. In 1960, Bremen carried approximately 28,000 passengers across the Atlantic from Europe to the US and back again. Beginning in 1960, the Bremen was also used in cruise service to the Caribbean and South America. A bulbous bow was added during her 1965–66 refit at the repair yard of North German Lloyd. In 1970, NDL merged with Hamburg America Line to form the large shipping company, Hapag Lloyd.

In September 1971 she made her final voyage from Bremen to New York for Hapag-Lloyd. In October 1971 Bremen was sold to Greek shipping company Chandris Cruises for 40 million DM after 175 Atlantic crossings and 117 cruises for NDL. The sale was completed in January, 1972.

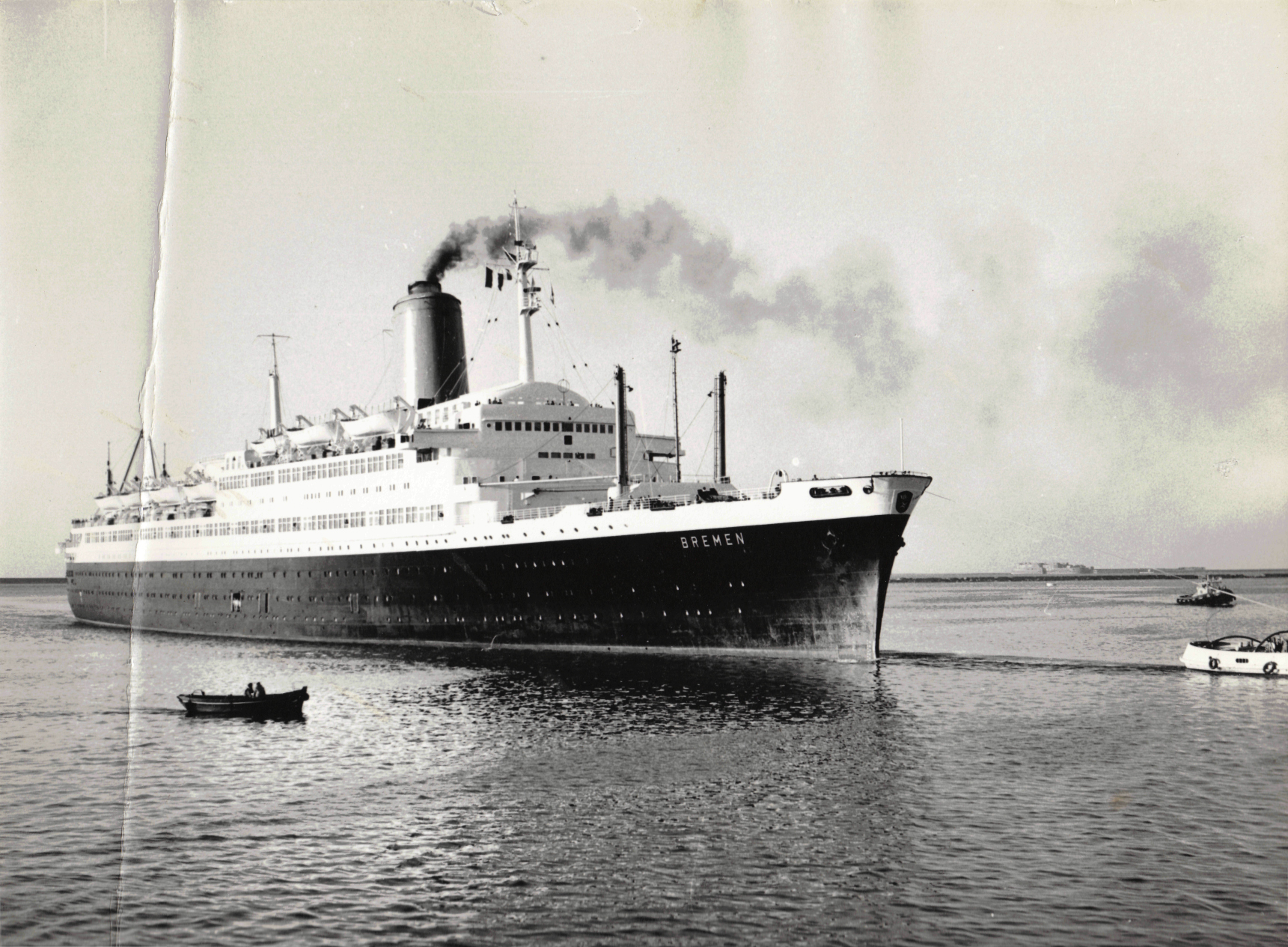
Bremen arriving in Cherbourg in July 1971

=== Later career and fate ===
After another refit, which changed her tonnage to 32,801 tons, Regina became the flagship of Chandris Cruises and inaugurated her Mediterranean service, calling at Limassol for the first time on May 19 and taking passengers from Cyprus to Beirut, Haifa, Heraklion, Piraeus, Katakolon, Corfu, Dubrovnik and Venice. Regina continued calling at Limassol regularly every two weeks and her cruises became extremely popular.

She cruised the world until 1974, when she was laid up in Piraeus because of rising fuel costs and the loss of emigration charters to Australia.

Filipinas Saudi I sinking

She was sold to Philippine Singapore Ports Corporation of Saudi Arabia and renamed Saudiphil I in 1977. On November 1, 1977, she arrived at Jeddah to be used as an accommodation ship for Filipino workers in Saudi Arabia.

In 1980 she was sold to the Philsimport International in Hong Kong and renamed Filipinas Saudi I. On June 8, 1980, While being towed by the Panamanian tug Sumatra to Taiwanese ship breakers in Kaohsiung, Taiwan, she rolled over onto her port side and sank stern first.

== Crew and passengers ==
TS Bremen had a total crew complement of 545, with three hundred crew members in the hotel department. She could carry approximately 1,150 passengers, 216 in first class and 934 in tourist class.

== Official number and call signs ==
Official numbers were a forerunner to IMO numbers. Pasteur had the UK official number 166305. She used the maritime call sign FNDC until 1940, and GNDW from 1940 to 1946.

== Popular culture ==
The magician duo Siegfried & Roy met on Bremen in 1960, where Siegfried worked as a steward and Roy as a page. The magic show, which they performed together on the ship for the first time, was the cornerstone of their later careers. The pair were not fired after bringing a live cheetah on board because the captain realized the show was enjoyed by the tourists who were guests on the ship.
