= SS Gallia =

French ocean liner, built 1913

Coordinates: 38°27′N 07°30′E

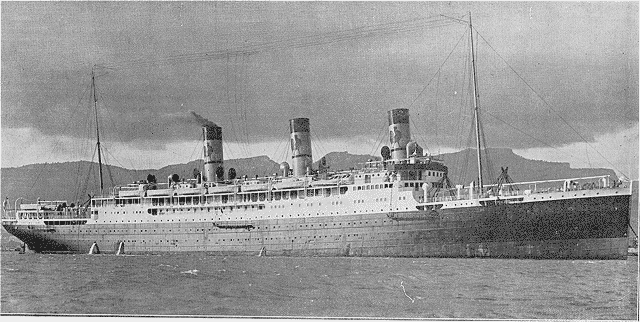
- Gallia in 1913

History

France
- Name: Gallia
- Namesake: Gallia
- Owner: Cie de Navigation Sud-Atlantique
- Operator: Cie de Navigation Sud-Atlantique
- Port of registry: Bordeaux
- Route: Bordeaux – Buenos Aires
- Builder: Société Nouvelle des Forges et Chantiers de la Méditerranée
- Yard number: 1056
- Completed: 1913
- Identification: code letters JHWG
- Fate: Sunk 4 October 1916

General characteristics
- Type: Ocean liner
- Tonnage: 14,966 GRT, 5,895 NRT
- Length: 574.2 ft (175.0 m)
- Beam: 62.8 ft (19.1 m)
- Depth: 36.9 ft (11.2 m)
- Installed power: 26,000 hp
- Propulsion: 2 × triple-expansion engines; 1 × exhaust steam turbine; 3 × screw propellers
- Speed: 18 knots (33 km/h)
- Capacity: 1,000 passengers
- Troops: 6,000
- Armament: (as armed merchant cruiser); 5 × 140 mm guns; 4 × 47 mm guns
- Notes: sister ships: Lutetia, Massilia

SS Gallia was a transatlantic ocean liner of the Compagnie de Navigation Sud-Atlantique built in 1913. Gallia was the Roman name for the province of Gaul.

In the First World War Gallia was converted into first an armed merchant cruiser and then a troop ship. In 1916 she was torpedoed and sunk by the German U-Boat SM U-35 in the Mediterranean Sea with great loss of life.

== Building and peacetime service ==
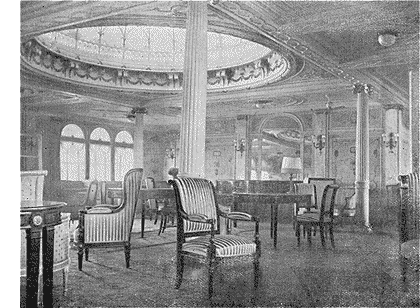
Salon de musique aboard Gallia

The Société Nouvelle des Forges et Chantiers de la Méditerranée built Gallia at La Seyne-sur-Mer as one of a set of three liners for Compagnie de Navigation Sud-Atlantique's mail and passenger service between France and South America. The same shipyard also built her sister ship Massilia. Chantiers de l'Atlantique built Lutetia, the other member of the trio.

Gallia's registered length was 574.2 ft (175.0 m), her beam was 62.8 ft (19.1 m) and her depth was 36.9 ft (11.2 m). Her tonnages were 14,966 GRT and 5,895 NRT. She was equipped for wireless telegraphy, operated by the Compagnie générale radiotélégraphique (CGR).

Gallia sailed between Bordeaux and Rio de Janeiro in 10 days, and between Bordeaux and Buenos Aires in 13 days.

== First World War ==
When the First World War broke out Gallia was converted into an armed merchant cruiser. Her primary armament was five 140 mm (5.5 in) guns and her secondary armament was four 47 mm guns.

In 1915 Gallia was refitted as a troopship.

On 3 October 1916 Gallia left Toulon unescorted for Thessaloniki in Greece carrying 1,650 French soldiers, 350 Serbian soldiers and 350 crew and a cargo of artillery and ammunition. The next day the German submarine SM U-35, commanded by Lothar von Arnauld de la Perière, torpedoed her southwest of Sardinia. (Arnauld de la Perière would receive Pour le Mérite on 11 October 1916).

Ammunition aboard Gallia exploded and the ship sank in 15 minutes. Because of the rapid sinking, panic broke out on board resulting in lifeboats capsizing, and thousands of soldiers jumping overboard. The ship's wireless was disabled by the explosions, preventing the sending of a distress signal. The next day the French Navy-protected cruiser Châteaurenault rescued 1,200 survivors.

The exact number of casualties needs to be ascertained but it was over 1000. A list of missing personnel was published on 31 October 1917 by the Tribunal Civil of Toulon. It gave the names of 44 sailors and 553 soldiers. Several individual soldiers known by their family members to have died were not on the list. The names of the Serbian soldiers were also not included.

The sinking was one of the greatest losses of life in a maritime disaster involving a single French ship and the second deadliest maritime disaster in the First World War, even worse than that of RMS Lusitania.

== See also ==
- List by death toll of ships sunk by submarines

== Bibliography ==
- Lloyd's Register of Shipping. Vol. I. London: Lloyd's Register of Shipping. 1914.
- Hillion, Daniel (1992). Paquebots (in French). Rennes: Editions Ouest-France. p. 24. ISBN 978-2737314339.
- Du Manoir, J. Rapport de l'Enseigne de vaisseau Le Courtois du Manoir (in French). Archives de la Marine.
