= Compagnie de Navigation Sud-Atlantique =

French shipping company

- Industry: Shipping, transportation
- Predecessor: Societe d'Etudes de navigation
- Founded: 1912; 114 years ago
- Founder: Cyprien Fabre
- Defunct: 1962
- Successor: Chargeurs Réunis, then Messageries Maritimes
- Area served: Europe – South America

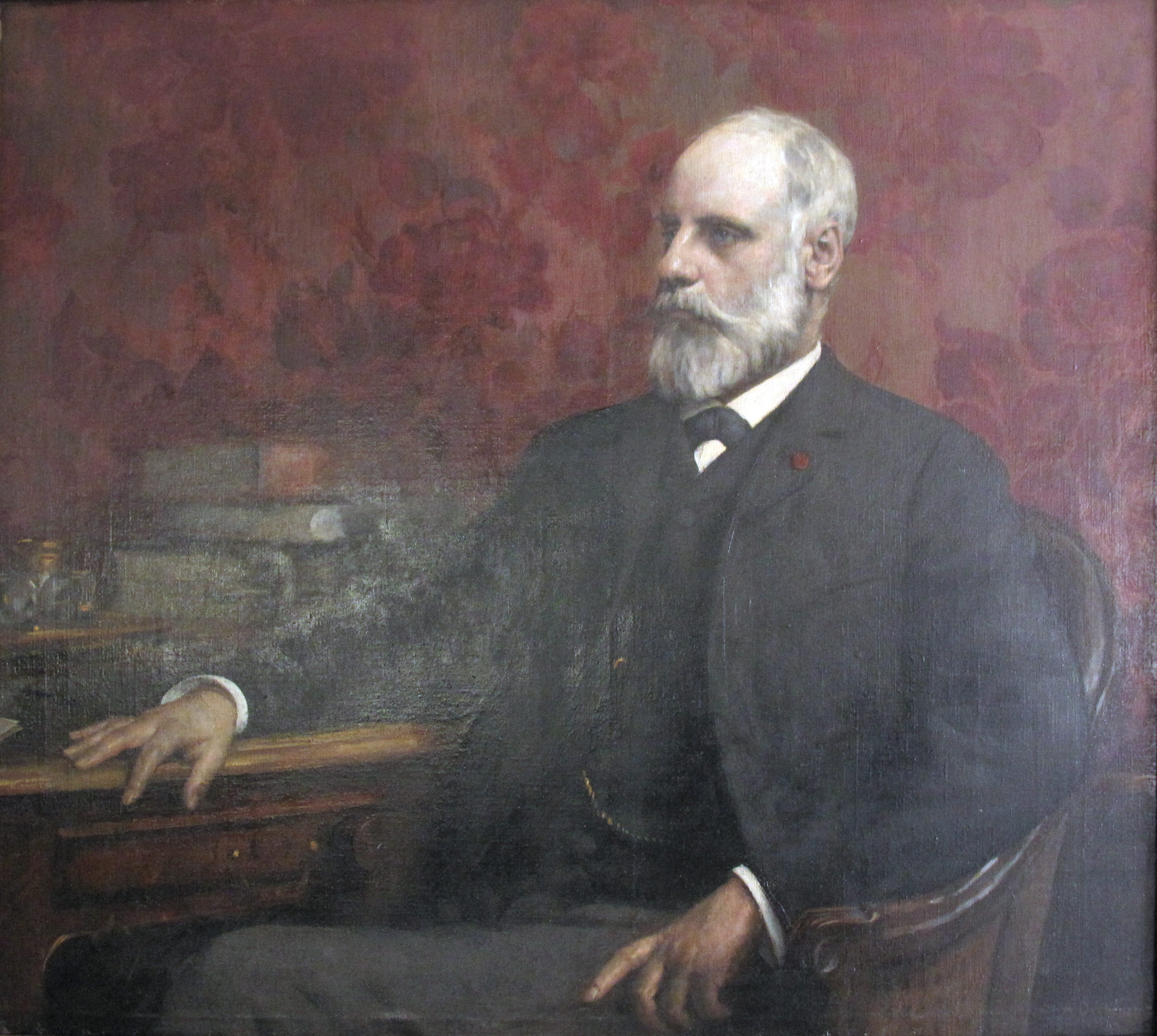
Portrait of Cyprien Fabre by Adolphe Déchenaud

Compagnie de Navigation Sud-Atlantique was a French shipping company prominent in the South American routes.

== Founding ==
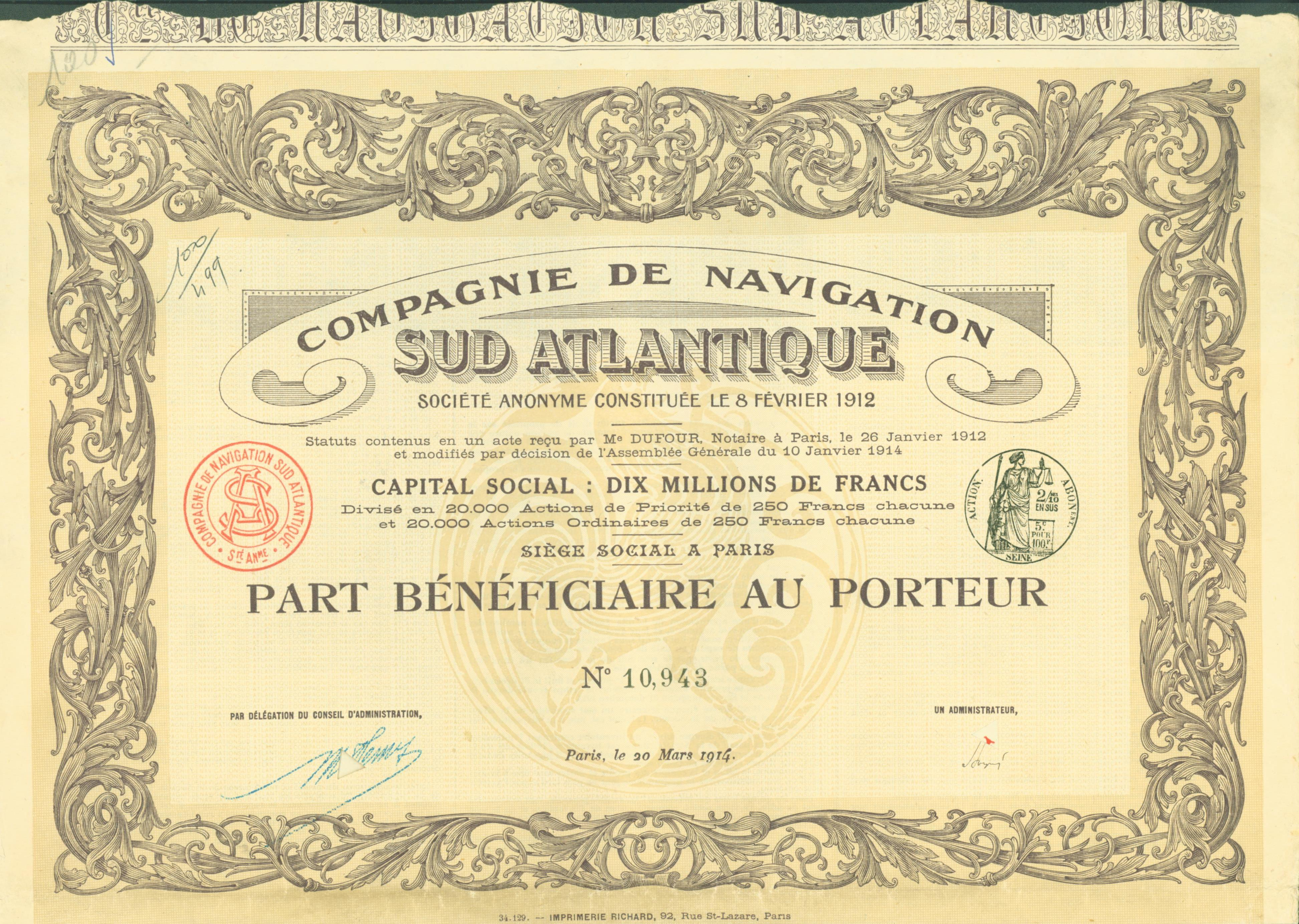
Part Bénéficiaire au Porteur of the Compagnie de Navigation Sud Atlantique S. A., issued 20 March 1914

In July 1912 a new convention was entered into between the French government and the Societe d'Etudes de Navigation, a nominal concessionaire, which ceded its rights to Compagnie de Navigation Sud-Atlantique. Messageries Maritimes, had held the contracts for the South American routes since 1860, but had done very little since 1904 to improve their South American service regarding it as not particularly profitable, though the speed of Messageries ships was also an issue.

The contract, signed on 11 July 1911, was for 25 years beginning 22 July 1912 and provided for a subsidised postal service, with round trip voyages every two weeks between Bordeaux, Lisbon, Dakar, Rio de Janeiro, Montevideo and Buenos Aires.

In addition the company was required to operate a non-subsidised commercial service with voyages at least once per month between Bordeaux, Dakar, Pernambuco, Bahia, Rio de Janeiro, Santos, Montevideo and Buenos Aires by vessels of not less than 4,000 tons cargo capacity and not less than 11 knots average speed.

Compagnie de Navigation Sud-Atlantique was launched in early 1912, its capital being 15 million francs (£600,000).

== Fleet ==
As a precondition (art.26) for the subsidised contract and to ensure that sufficient ships were in service to provide a reliable mail service, the company was required to build, in France, four passenger liners of a minimum displacement of 11,000 tonnes, able to maintain a minimum speed of 15 knots between Bordeaux and Lisbon, and 18 knots between Lisbon and Buenos Aires. with a minimum length of 175 metres and provide six paquebots mixtes (passenger freighters).

The new company placed orders for new ships, with Chantiers de l'Atlantique at St. Nazaire for the 14,581 GRT Lutetia and with Forges & Chantiers de la Mediterranee at La Seyne for a similar ship, Gallia, both to be delivered in 1913. The third ship was Massilia, also built at La Seyne and launched in 1914, but not completed until 1920. Gallia was able to make the passage from Bordeaux to Buenos Aires in 15 days.

To achieve the promised service levels, (while the new-builds were advancing) the agreement (art.97) allowed that, temporarily, the company might operate vessels of 9,000 tons displacement at a speed of 14 knots from Buenos Aires to Lisbon and 15 knots from Lisbon to Buenos Aires and two of the vessels might be of foreign construction.

Thus a number of second-hand ships had to be acquired in order inaugurate the service. These included Avondale Castle launched in 1897 (from Union-Castle Line) and the aged La Bretagne and La Gascogne, which were built on 1886. These latter two were transferred from Compagnie Générale Transatlantique. The long-moribund (and very troublesome) Kaiser Friedrich was added to the fleet, and renamed Burdigala, but soon proved less useful than hoped.

Early on in the new company's existence a decision was made to paint the line's vessels in white. Therefore, in the second half of the year 1913 all vessels were painted in this way.

The company also had the practice of giving its ships the Latin variations of French names. For example, Lutetia = Paris, Massilia = Marseille, Gallia = Gaul, Burdigala = Bordeaux.

Due to the conditions created in the First World War, the 1912 was revised and renewed for a period of 10 years from the 13th of August 1920.

Gallia was lost in the First World War with substantial loss of life while serving as a troopship. Burdigala was also lost on troopship duties in Greek waters. The required fourth ship of series was never built. Massilia joined Lutetia as "running mates" in the post-war era. The next major addition was the 42,512 GRT L'Atlantique in 1930 but its working life was short, being destroyed by fire while sailing from Bordeaux to Le Havre in 1933. This necessitated the scrapping of the vessel. In 1939 Pasteur was added to the fleet. Her smaller size, 29,253 GRT, reflected reduced demand on the route.

Massilia might be called "the ship of exile" in its latter days. In 1939, on its voyage from La Rochelle, leaving 19 October 1939 and arriving Buenos Aires 5 November 1939, the ship was painted camouflage grey to dodge German submarines which were already on the prowl. It carried on board 384 passengers fleeing Europe, of which the largest contingent were Spanish republicans who had previously taken refuge in France. Amongst this group were many artists, journalists, writers, academics and theatre figures.

It also played a starring role in June 1940, carrying a large number of prominent politicians, including 27 of the Vichy 80, fleeing France to North Africa after the capitulation of the country to Germany and Italy and the formation of the Vichy government.

The company was said to have ships that were ill-fated, which was true for Gallia, L'Atlantique and Burdigala, but not for the long service lives of Lutetia, Pasteur and Massilia.

== Change of control ==
In 1914, the company was placed under the control of Compagnie Générale Transatlantique and was taken over in 1916 by Compagnie Maritime des Chargeurs Réunis. In 1928 Chargeurs Réunis took over Sud Atlantique's intermediate service.

The Compagnie des Messageries Maritimes then took over the South American service in 1962, with the only three passenger ships still left, i.e. the 1951 built MS Laennec, Louis Lumière and Charles Tellier, nicknamed 'les savants' (the scientists). This ended the Compagnie de Navigation Sud-Atlantique as a brand name. Messageries Maritimes continued the operation of these vessels on this South American service until 1966, at which time they were sold, and the service was then performed by the new motor ship Pasteur.

== Ships of the Compagnie de Navigation Sud-Atlantique ==
| Name | Shipyard | GRT | Length [m] | Passengers | Launched | Notes |
|---|---|---|---|---|---|---|
| Alba | Bremer Vulkan, Bremen | 8324 | 125.3 | – | 1912 | ex-Sierra Ventana built for Norddeutscher Lloyd, 1919 seized by France, 1920 purchased from French Government renamed Alba, 1926 sold to Chargeurs Reunis renamed Amerique, 1936 scrapped. |
| Burdigala | F. Schichau, Danzig | 12480 | 183 | 400 First Class, 250 Second Class, 700 Third Class | 1898 | ex-Kaiser Friedrich, 1912 purchased from Norddeutscher Lloyd renamed Burdigala, 1913 laid up, 1917 sunk by a mine in the Kea Channel, near Mykonos. |
| Charles Tellier | Ateliers & Chantiers de La Loire, St. Nazaire | 12007 | 125.3 | – | 1952 | 1962 transferred to Messageries Maritimes not renamed, 1967 sold to Hong Kong owners (Panama flag) renamed Le Havre Abeto, 1978 laid up, 1984 scrapped. |
| Divona | Fairfield Shipbuilding Co., Glasgow | 6405 | 125.3 | – | 1887 | ex-Ormuz, 1912 purchased from Orient Steam Nav. Co. renamed Divona, 1919 laid up, 1922/23 scrapped. |
| Gallia | Forges & Chantiers de la Mediterranee, La Seyne | 14966 | 174.7 | – | 1913 | 1914 armed merchant cruiser later troopship, 1916 torpedoed and sunk as a troopship by German submarine U-35 with the loss of 600+ lives. |
| Garonna | Fairfield Shipbuilding Co., Glasgow | 5531 | 125.3 | – | 1897 | ex-Avondale Castle, 1912 purchased from Union Castle Line renamed Garonna, 1920 scrapped |
| La Bretagne | Chantiers de Penhoet, St. Nazaire | 7112 | 150 | 390 first class, 65 second class, 600 third class | 1886 | ex-La Bretagne, 1912 transferred from Cie. Generale Transatlantique not renamed, 1919 renamed Alesia, 1923 sold for scrapping, whilst under tow, the towline parted and the vessel ended up stranded on the Dutch island of Texel |
| La Gascogne | Forges & Chantiers de la Mediterranee, La Seyne | 7395 | 125.3 | – | 1886 | ex-La Gascogne launched as L'Algerie, 1912 transferred from Cie. Generale Transatlantique not renamed, 1918 reverted to CGT, 1919 scrapped. |
| Laennec | Ateliers & Chantiers de La Loire, St. Nazaire | 12007 | 125.3 | – | 1952 | 1962 transferred to Messageries Maritimes not renamed, 1966 sold to Hong Kong owners (Panama flag) renamed Belle Abeto, 1976 destroyed by fire. |
| L'Atlantique | Chantiers de l'Atlantique, St. Nazaire | 40945 | 223 | 1238 | 1930 | 1933 damaged by fire, 1936 scrapped at Port Glasgow. |
| Lutetia | Chantiers de l'Atlantique, St. Nazaire | 14783 | 175 | 958 | 1913 | 1914 troopship for US forces in the Transport Force Newport News Division, 1915 armed merchant cruiser, later hospital ship and again troopship, 1919/20 refitted and in 1920 returned to service, 1938 laid up and scrapped. |
| Massilia | Forges & Chantiers de la Mediterranee, La Seyne | 15147 | 175 | 1000 | 1930 | Construction delayed by WW1. Completed in 1920, 1940 laid up at Marseille and used as a naval-training school, 1944 scuttled by Germans to block the port of Marseille, wreck later scrapped. |
| Meduana | Swan, Hunter & Wigham Richardson, Wallsend on Tyne | 10123 | 147 | 800 | 1923 | Launched 1920 but caught fire and sank at shipyard, later raised and completed, 1928 to Chargeurs Reunis renamed Kerguelen, 1940 seized by Germany and renamed Winrich von Kniprode, 1945-1948 restored and rebuilt as Kerguelen, 1955 scrapped at Antwerp. |
| Mosella | Swan, Hunter & Wigham Richardson, Wallsend on Tyne | 10123 | 147 | – | 1922 | 1927 took part in rescue of passengers from Principessa Mafalda, 1928 to Chargeurs Reunis renamed Jamaique, 1954 scrapped. |
| Pasteur | Chantiers de l'Atlantique, St. Nazaire | 29253 | 212.4 | 751 | 1938 | 1940 placed under Cunard-White Star Management, 1945 returned to owners, 1957 laid up, 1957 sold to Norddeutscher Lloyd renamed Bremen, 1971 sold to Chandris Line, renamed Regina Magna, 1974 laid up, 1977 floating hotel at Djeddah renamed Saudiphil 1, 1980 renamed Filipinas Saudi 1, 1980 sunk in tow to the breakers. |
| Sequana | Workman, Clark & Co, Belfast, Ireland | 5557 | 138 | 566 | 1898 | Built for Ellerman Lines as City of Corinth and sold in 1912 to Cie de Navigation Sud-Atlantique. Torpedoed on 8 June 1917 by German U-boat UC-72 in the Bay of Biscay. Some 196 (mostly Senegalese) troops, three passengers and six crew died. |

== Fleet ==
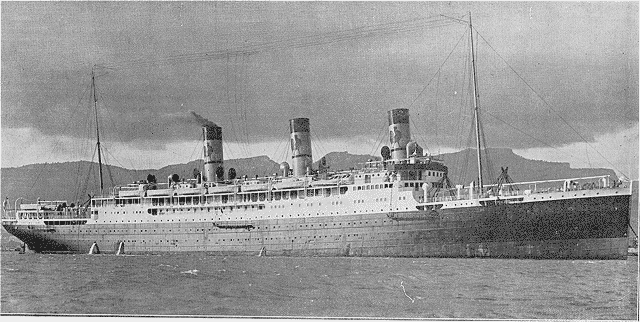
Gallia shortly after launch in 1913

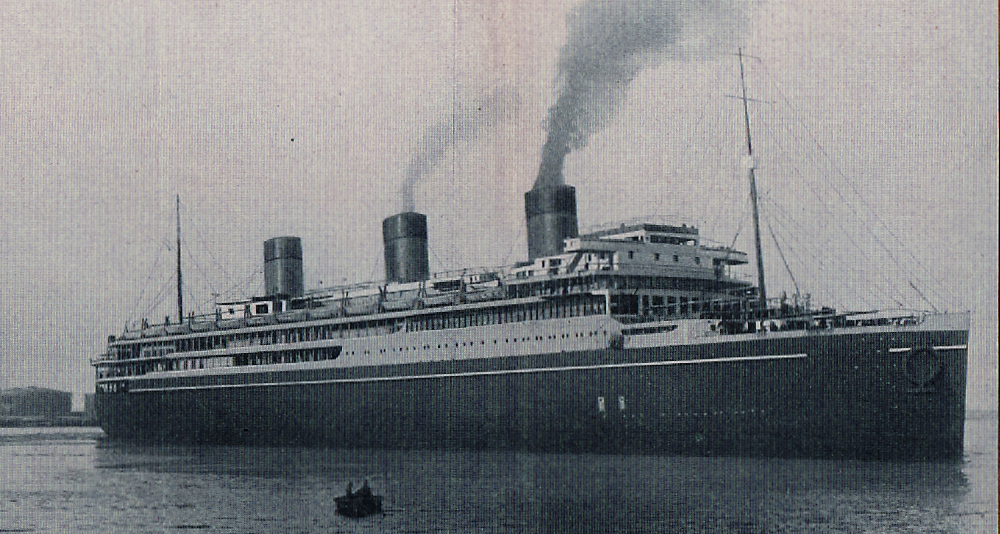
L'Atlantique 1930–33

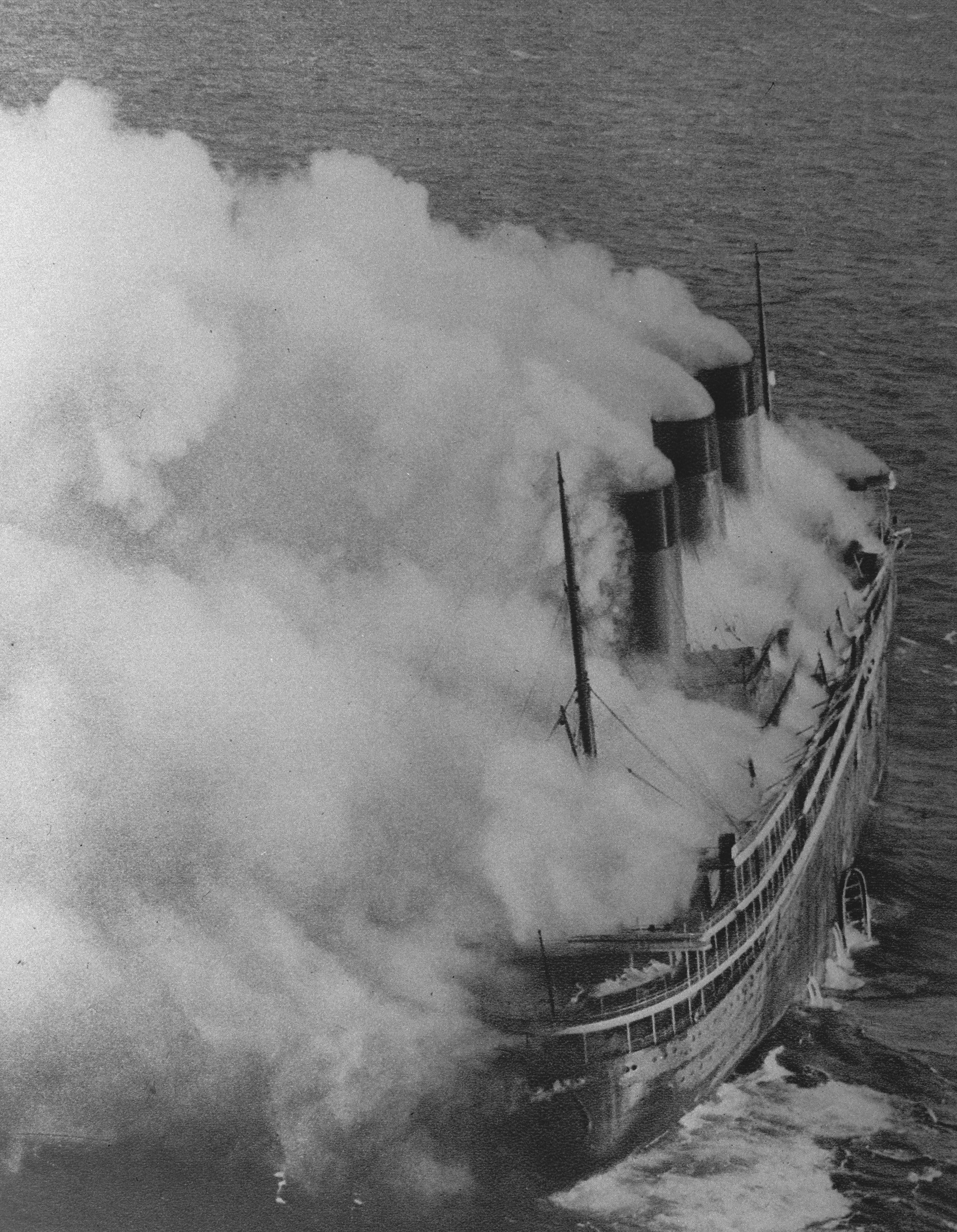
L'Atlantique on fire, January 1933

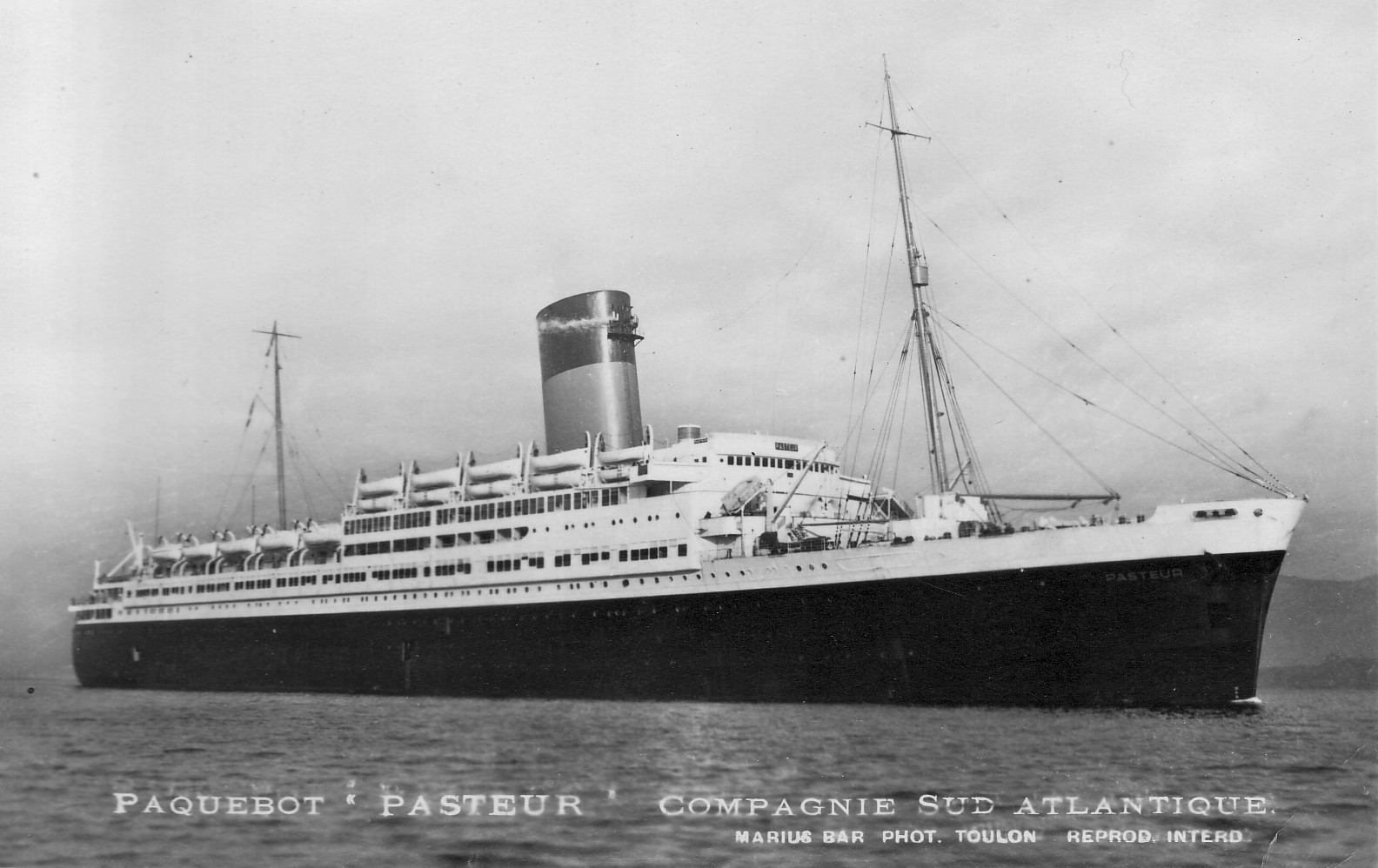
Pasteur

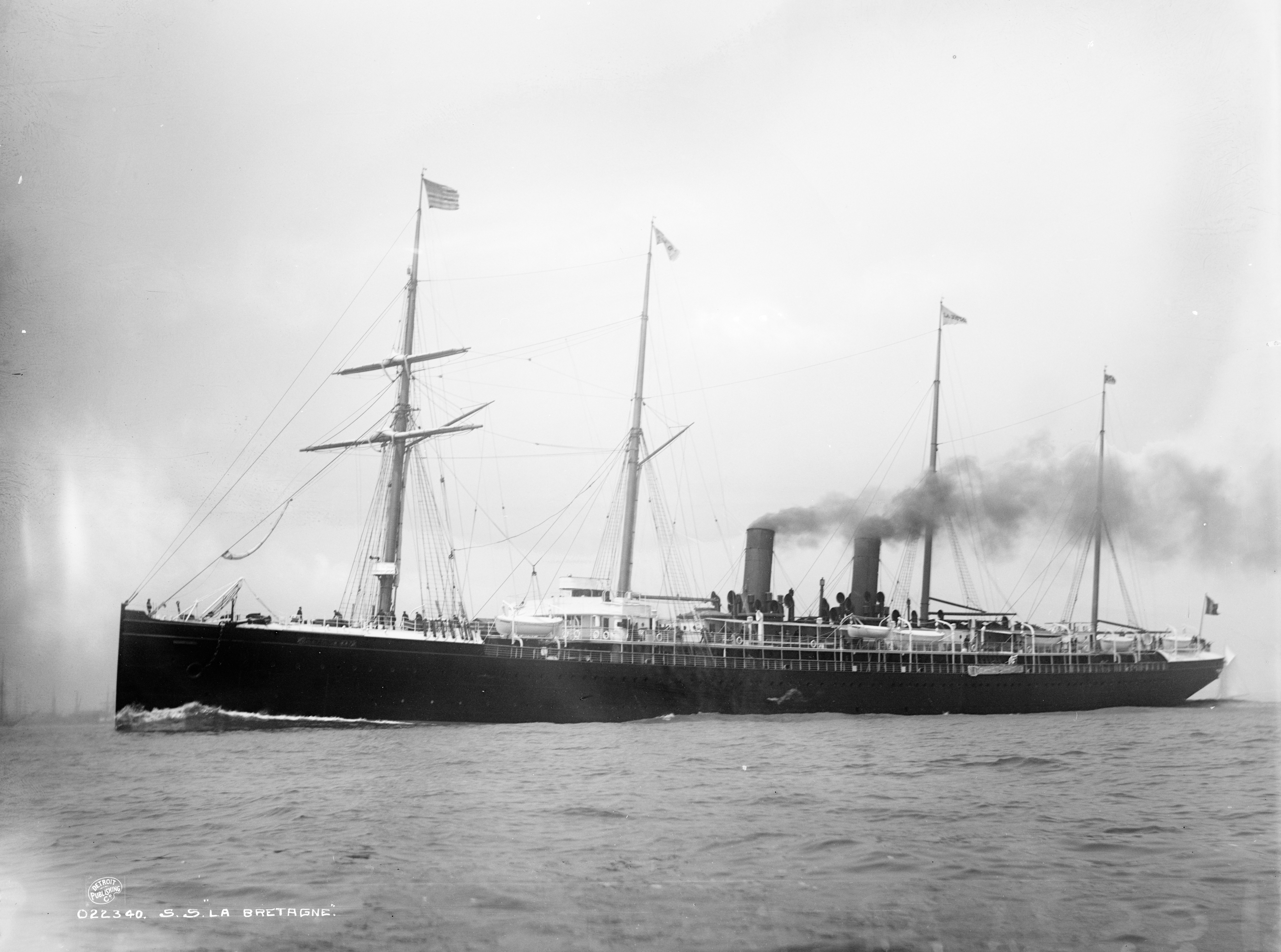
La Bretagne as she appeared c. 1890–95

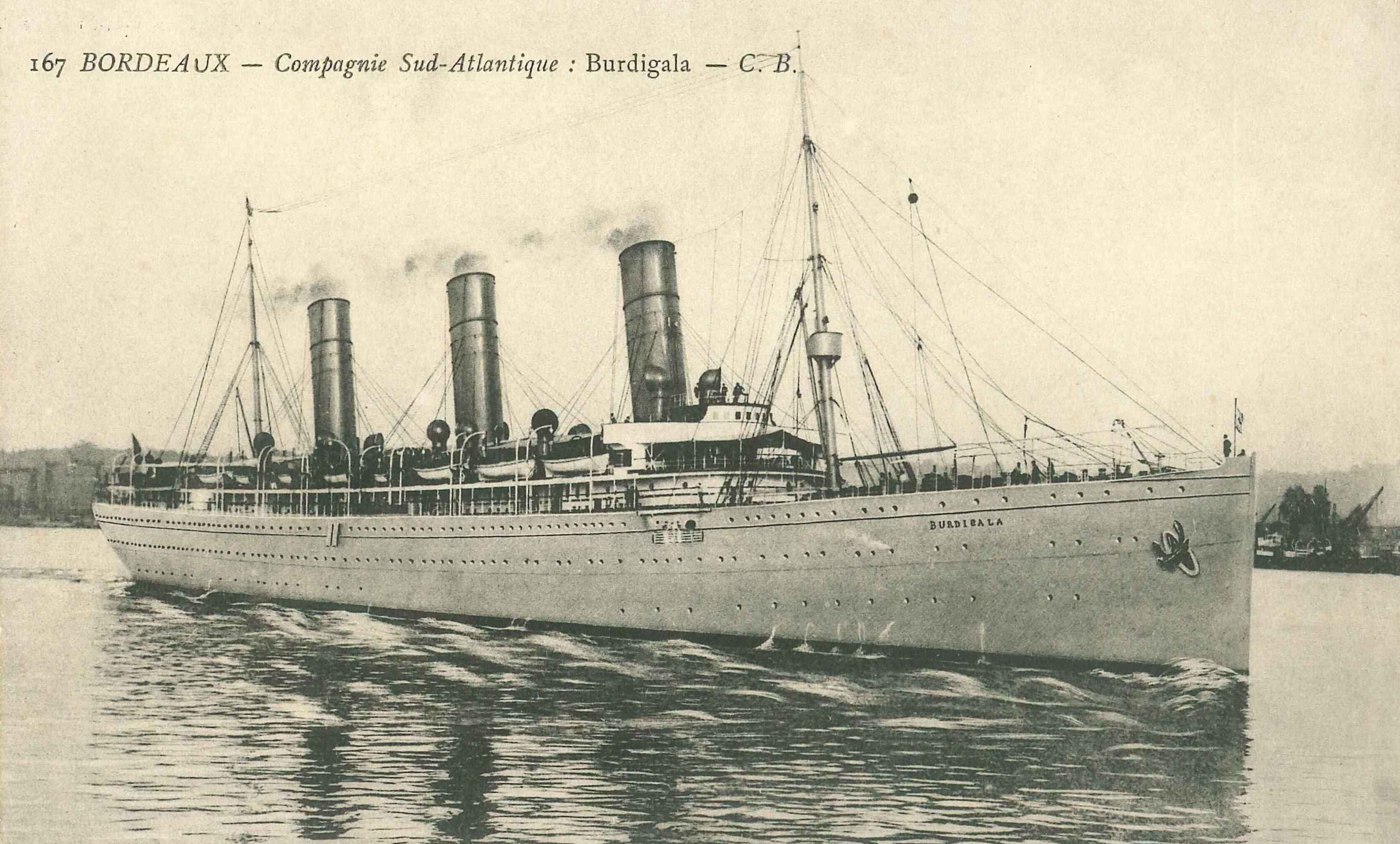
Burdigala

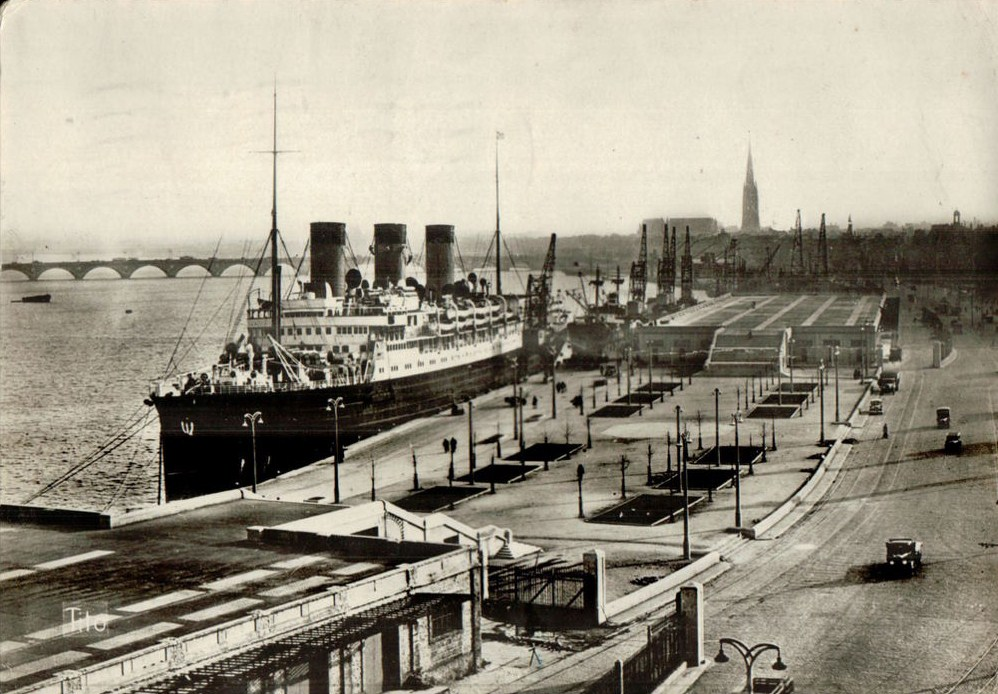
Massilia at Bordeaux
