= SS Burdigala =

Ocean liner (1897–1916)

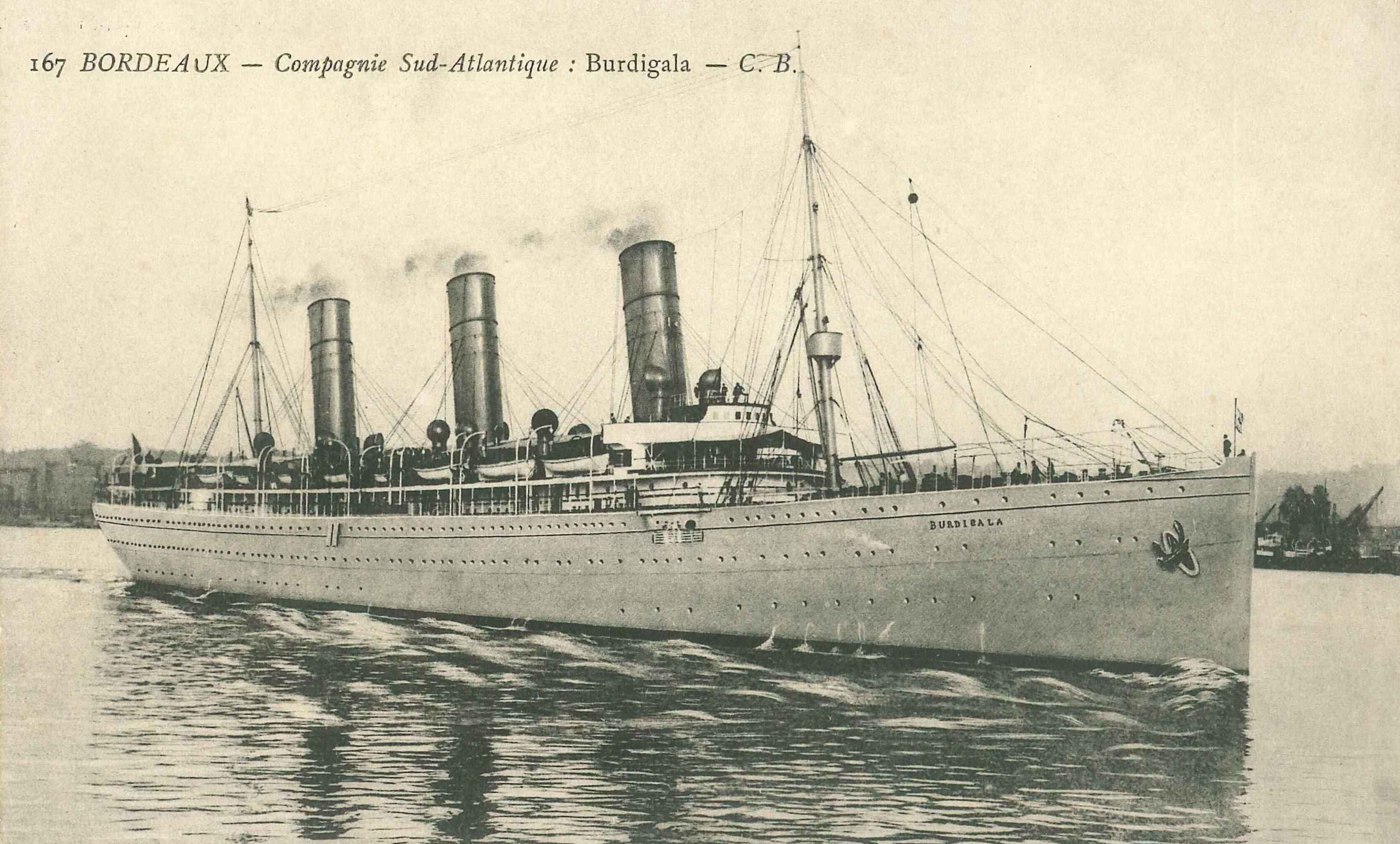
- Burdigala in 1912

History
- Name: Kaiser Friedrich (1898–1912); Burdigala (1912-1916)
- Namesake: Kaiser Friedrich III
- Owner: Norddeutscher Lloyd (1898-1899); Hamburg America Line (1899-1912); Compagnie de Navigation Sud-Atlantique (1912-1916)
- Port of registry: (German Empire) Bremen, Germany (1898–1912); Bordeaux, France (1912–1916)
- Builder: Ferdinand Schichau Werft
- Cost: £525,000
- Yard number: 587
- Launched: 5 October 1897
- Completed: 12 May 1898
- Maiden voyage: 7 June 1898
- In service: 7 June 1898
- Fate: Sunk by mine, 14 November 1916

General characteristics
- Type: Ocean liner
- Tonnage: 12,480 GRT
- Length: 183 m (600 ft 5 in)
- Beam: 19.4 m (63 ft 8 in)
- Installed power: 5-cylinder reciprocating steam engines with quadruple expansion
- Propulsion: Twin propellers
- Speed: 20 knots (37 km/h; 23 mph)
- Capacity: 1,350 passengers; 400 First Class; 250 Second Class; 700 Third Class
- Crew: 420

SS Burdigala was an ocean liner that was built and operated by Norddeutscher Lloyd (NDL) before then serving under Hamburg America Line (HAPAG) and subsequently Compagnie Générale Transatlantique (CGT). The ship was built as Kaiser Friedrich in 1898 for NDL, a German shipping line. Designed to break the speed record for a transatlantic liner and thereby win the Blue Riband, Kaiser Friedrich never achieved the necessary speeds. After a short career with NDL and an equally short period of service with NDL's main German competitor, HAPAG, the ship was mothballed for a decade. After being sold to the French shipping line CGT, the vessel re-entered service as Burdigala. In 1916, while en route from Thessaloniki to Toulon, the liner struck a naval mine laid by the German U-boat U-73 in the Aegean Sea and sank near Kea, Greece.

== Construction and design ==
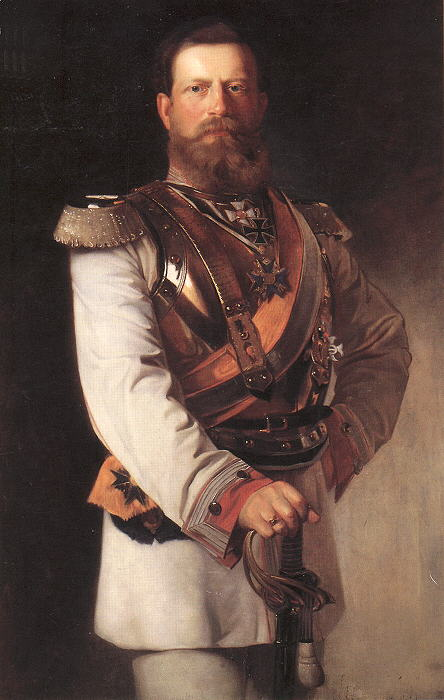
The ship was named after German Emperor Friedrich III

Norddeutscher Lloyd (NDL) first ordered SS Kaiser Wilhelm der Grosse with the goal of breaking the North Atlantic speed record (then held by the Cunard Line's RMS Lucania), thereby claiming the Blue Riband for Germany. Soon thereafter, the company ordered a second "Atlantic greyhound" from the Schichau-Werke shipyard at Danzig. The goal of cementing their control of the Blue Riband was built into the terms of the contract NDL signed with Schichau. The specifications demanded a speed of at least 22.5 knots (41.7 km/h; 25.9 mph) for at least six hours and a guaranteed minimum speed of 21 knots (39 km/h; 24 mph), figures intended to ensure that transatlantic trips would not exceed six days.

Kaiser Friedrich, built by Schichau as Number 587, was powered by two quadruple-expansion reciprocating steam engines that drove two three-blade propellers. These five-cylinder engines were fed by ten boilers, whose fumes were exhausted through three large funnels. The entire plant was designed to generate 28,000 shaft horsepower (21,000 kW) at full power. Contrary to common shipbuilding practices of the era, the engineers placed the engines slightly forward, between the second and third boilers. The boilers were grouped into three separate watertight compartments.

By the end of her completion, the 21,000-ton Kaiser Friedrich had cost £525,000, surpassing by far the initial budgeted cost. The flush-deck design, coupled with relatively low freeboard and a long forecastle were distinctive, as was the ship's curvilinear bridge. In addition to these features, Kaiser Friedrich (like some other German steamers of her time) was designed and constructed to operate as an armed merchant cruiser in the event of war, being intended to serve as an ancillary unit in the Imperial German Navy.

=== A floating palace ===
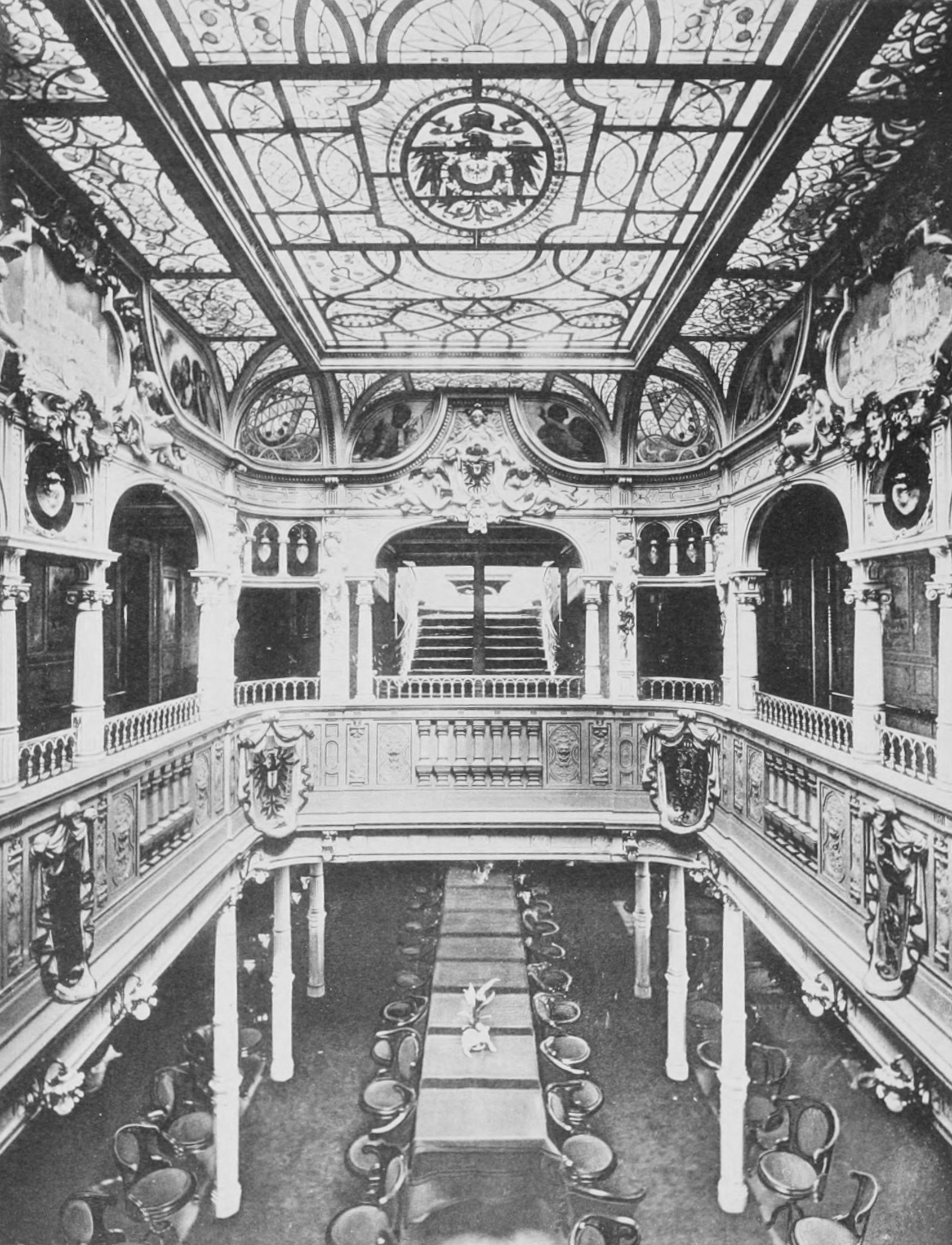
First cabin of Kaiser Friedrich

Although in terms of the technical characteristics Kaiser Friedrich was inferior to Kaiser Wilhelm der Grosse, in terms of interior design and lavishness she was much more sophisticated, with a harmonious blend of high quality and good taste. All the 180 first-class and 111 second-class cabins were placed on higher decks, offering their occupants remarkable views. Some of the first-class cabins were also convertible into large seating areas. In addition to the 420 crew, the ship could accommodate 1,350 passengers out of which 400 in first class, 250 in second and 700 passengers in third-class. Like the most sumptuous transatlantic ships of her time, Kaiser Friedrich's main dining and living rooms were lit by extravagant chandeliers and the surrounding walls dominated by the hanging Caryatids representing the art and sciences and decorated with painted panels portraying Kaiser Friedrich III's family and their respective coat of arms. The walls were painted in a shade of ivory, adorned by gold ornaments, while the carpets were all red. The most prominent feature though was the ship's promenade deck, especially in the first class areas where the deck was open so as not to obstruct the view and extended along the highest point of the ship's admit for 100 metres (330 ft). The ship was also equipped with smoking lounges, bars, music room and a library.

== Career ==
=== Short maiden voyage ===
The construction work was completed in May 1898 and Kaiser Friedrich embarked on its maiden voyage on 12 May 1898 from Danzig to Bremerhaven, the home port of NDL. During sea trials, the engineers of NDL, which were present on board, discovered with disappointment that even with the greatest of efforts she could only reach the speed of 20 knots (37 km/h; 23 mph) and by no means exceed it. Upon the ship's arrival at the port and due to its poor performance with respect to the low speed she had achieved during the trials, NDL categorically denied receiving the ship, adhering strictly to the explicit terms of the contract. Only after F. Schichau had confirmed that he would significantly improve the ship's speed and performance did NDL agree to include Kaiser Friedrich in its fleet, planning its first transatlantic voyage from Bremerhaven to Southampton and from there onward to New York City.

=== Improvements ===
Since both companies had titles of ownership of the ship, one can say with certainty that they were both interested in finding a solution for the speed problems. The fact that the larger share of ownership, 62% belonged to F. Schichau, which at that point was trying to penetrate the global shipping market, combined with the explicit terms of the contract that made the return of the NDL ship not only possible but also likely in case it deviated from the terms of agreement, brought F. Schichau in a rather difficult and defenseless position. In order to preserve the prestige of the company, it was essential that a solution should be found, a solution satisfactory to all. The first step involved sending the ship off to Southampton where it underwent some "structural adjustments" whose principal objective was to improve the speed. The ship remained for several days in the dry dock yards "Prince of Wales", during which time the length of its two propeller blades was shortened by 30 centimetres (12 in). On 1 June 1898 the ship sailed back to Bremerhaven.

=== Maiden voyage to New York ===
On 7 June 1898, Kaiser Friedrich began its sea journey from Bremen to Southampton under the helm of an experienced NDL captain, Ludwig A. Störmer. The next day, on 8 June 1898, the ship's first transatlantic trip to New York City commenced, carrying 209 passengers in the first and second classes, and 183 in the third, of which the majority were immigrants. The journey had started off well, but very quickly the bad weather and a number of mechanical problems significantly reduced the speed of the ship. Afterwards, the left engine ceased operating for 20 hours and 26 minutes, shortly followed by the right engine, which stopped running for 11 hours and 42 minutes. Fortunately for the passengers and the crew, the engines halted separately, not simultaneously. The cause of mechanical problems was later considered by ship specialists to be overheating of bearings or as it was formally stated in The Marine Engineer Magazine "the failure of the slide valves to work smoothly and to the breakage of studs on the air pump brackets, so that a proper vacuum could not be maintained".

The result was disastrous: it took 7 days, 10 hours and 15 minutes for Kaiser Friedrich to cover the classic route from Southampton to Sandy Hook, New York City, where it arrived on 16 June 1898. Further hours of delay were added to its already poor time count, since the ship had to stay outside the New York City harbor and wait for entry allowance because of the mines that were placed to guard the harbour after the outbreak of the Spanish–American War in April 1898.

The next day, NDL hosted a press conference in the ship's foyer, which was attended by media representatives, shipbuilders, engineers and ship-owners. As publicized by The New York Times in an article dated 17 June 1898 and headlined "The Kaiser Friedrich – The Fine Big Steamship Makes Her Maiden Trip in Over Seven Days – Engines Easily Overheated", the average vessel speed during its first transatlantic crossing was 17.73 knots (32.84 km/h; 20.40 mph), pointing out that "nobody knows the actual maximum speed of the vessel", as the average speed had been lowered due to mechanical problems.

=== Return home and future voyages ===
On 25 June 1898, Kaiser Friedrich set off on its return voyage, without passengers, which lasted 9 days, 2 hours and 30 minutes to Southampton. Given the very low average speed of 15 knots (28 km/h; 17 mph) and a new set of mechanical problems which arose again during her return, NDL cancelled Kaiser Friedrich's next two scheduled trips and the ship was sent to F. Schichau's shipyard at Danzig for repairs, always with the aim to improve her speed limit to exceed 20 and reach 22 knots. On 4 September 1898 the ship was given back to NDL.

On 14 September 1898, Kaiser Friedrich embarked on her second transatlantic trip from Southampton to New York City, where she arrived after 6 days and 12 hours on 21 September 1898, traveling at an average speed of 19–20 knots. The corrections made by F. Schicha's engineers slightly improved the ship's speed performance, but not enough to cover the most important term of the contract which had set the service speed of the ship at 22 knots. Over the next three journeys Kaiser Friedrich had sailed by the end of travel season in December 1898, the speed remained at these levels without significant change. In the winter of 1898–1899 the ship remained for three months at Schichau's shipyard in Danzig for corrections and repairs, always with the aim to increase its service speed. In addition to installing new air pumps in the engine and boiler rooms, the three funnels were extended by 4.5 metres (15 ft) resulting in a noticeable change in appearance.

With the start of the new season, the mended ship set off to its first transatlantic voyage in the year 1899, from Southampton to New York City on 5 March 1898. The crossing, which took 7 days and 40 minutes before reaching the Sandy Hook lighthouse, after the ship had lost two blades from its propellers, extinguished the last bit of hope that the ship with any new changes would ever approach the 22-knot threshold. Because NDL did not own any other ship of Kaiser Friedrich's size, to cover the gap which Kaiser Friedrich's removal from their fleet would cause, and also because NDL did not want to return a ship 38% owned by them to the manufacturers, they patiently decided they would give Schichau's engineers yet another chance to finally put it right. Eight more transatlantic trips followed, the shortest of which was 6 days, 22 hours and 30 minutes which finally and irrevocably classified the ship as belonging to the 19 knots class.

=== NDL's farewell ===
On 27 June 1899, during the ship's return from New York City, the company returned Kaiser Friedrich to its manufacturer on the grounds that the ship did not cover the terms of the contract which set its service speed at 22 knots. At the same time NDL ordered a new ship, bigger and faster but with the (tested) specifications same as those of Kaiser Wilhelm der Grosse, by A.G. Vulcan. The new ship was SS Kronprinz Wilhelm, which claimed and won the Blue Riband trophy two years later in 1902, reaching the average speed of 23.09 knots (42.76 km/h; 26.57 mph). Until the delivery of this new ship, which bore the name of Kaiser Wilhelm II's son, NDL temporarily replaced Kaiser Friedrich with SS Kaiserin Maria Theresia (former SS Spree), which sank in May 1905, during the Russian-Japanese War.

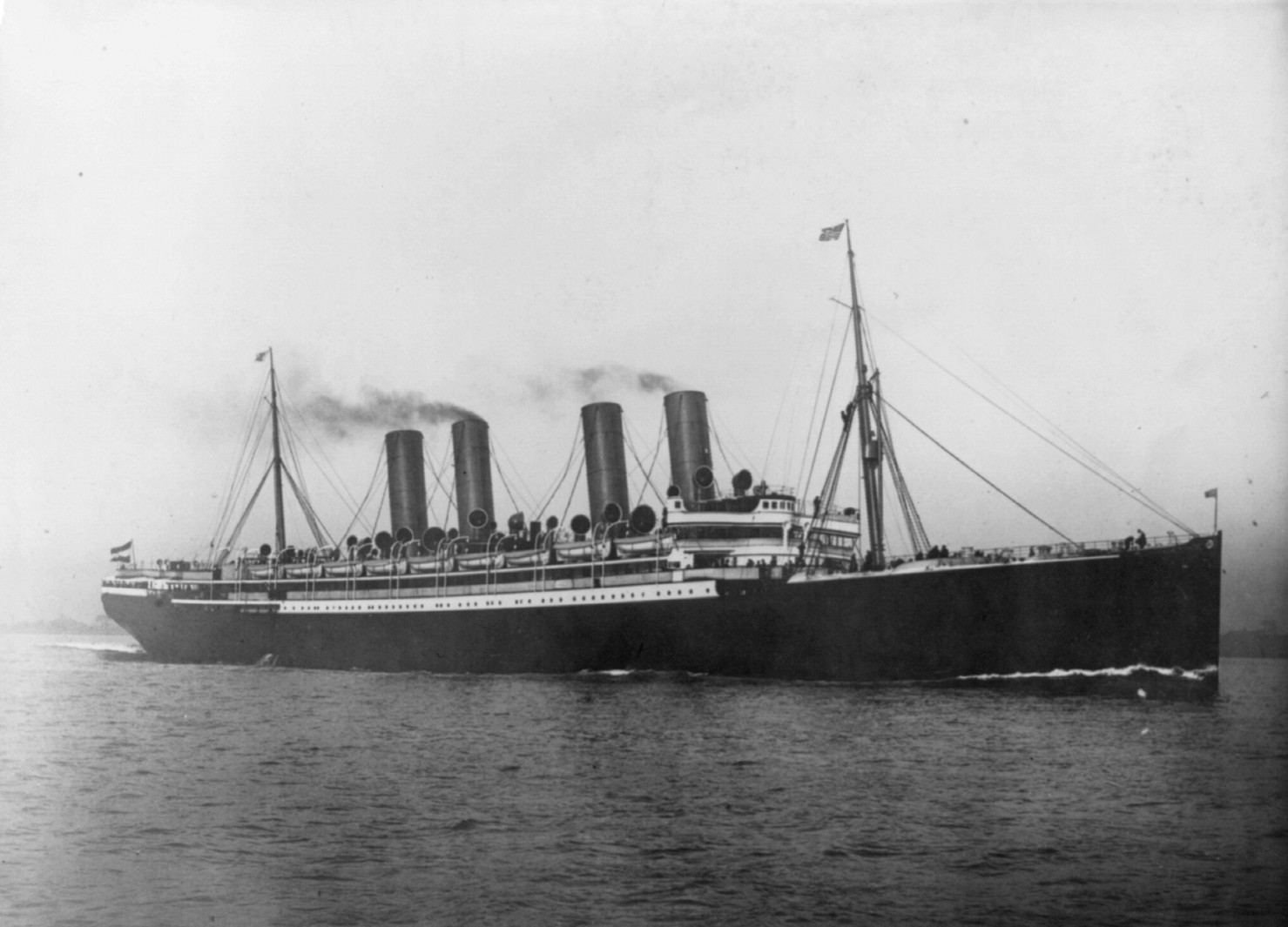
Kaiser Wilhelm Der Grosse

Immediately after the delivery of the new ship, a long legal battle between NDL and F. Schichau began, which ended in 1908 with NDL's victory. The press of the time, from both sides of the Atlantic, was widely involved in this unprecedented event. The New York Times in their article dated 28 June 1899, captioned "Kaiser Friedrich Rejected", extensively analyses the underlying facts and causes. The general manager of F. Schichau, vigorously objected to the court decision, claiming that the culprit was the poor quality of coal used as fuel by NDL. On 7 August 1899, he wrote a letter to the chief editor of the magazine The Marine Engineer, which reads:

Dear Sir, In your esteemed journal of 1 August, page 207, you write that the KAISER FRIEDRICH has been withdrawn by the Norddeutscher Lloyd from service and returned to her builders. This not being the fact, I request you kindly to rectify it, in the next issue of your esteemed journal, according to the following data: – The KAISER FRIEDRICH was the property of the firm of F. Schichau, and in spite of her built as a high speed passenger steamer, requiring a good quality of coal, the Norddeutscher Lloyd mostly gave her a very inferior coal – besides, many of the stokers had no previous experience. Under these circumstances it could not give surprise that the KAISER FRIEDRICH was not able to develop her full speed, and there was no other way for the firm of F. Schichau but to withdraw its steamer and give her into other hands. The KAISER FRIEDRICH will make her next voyages under the flag of the Hamburg America Line. Reiterating to you in advance my best thanks for this rectification,

I remain, dear Sir,

Yours very respectfully F. Schichau

=== Hamburg-America Line ===
The announcement by F. Schichau Shipyards that "the Kaiser Friedrich will make its next journeys under the flag of HAPAG (Hamburg America Line)" marked the beginning of the second chapter of later to be renamed Burdigala's history.

In 1898 HAPAG had sold one of its oceangoing ships, SS Normannia, to the Spanish government which was used as an auxiliary cruiser by the name SS Patriota during the Spanish–American War. This sale created a gap in the company's transatlantic fleet at a time when business was thriving, as the second wave of mass immigration to the Americas had reached its peak. Furthermore, because of the Spanish-American and the Second Anglo-Boer war in South Africa, a number of American and British ships had been pulled out of the North Atlantic route, creating in turn a considerable void in shipping.

This shortage of ships became a tremendous opportunity for German and French maritime companies, ready to reap enormous profits by covering the gap. HAPAG was the first to try to exploit this opportunity, but the absence of Normannia had been evident given, that its three major ocean vessels could not satisfy the increased demand. In order to fill this gap, while waiting to add SS Deutschland into its fleet, HAPAG decided to charter Kaiser Friedrich from the Schichau Company and include it immediately in its express line connecting Hamburg to Southampton, Cherbourg, and New York City.

On 2 October 1899, Kaiser Friedrich embarked on its first transatlantic voyage under the HAPAG colors with a red flag and the City of Hamburg coat of arms on its bow, departing from Southampton for New York City. Towards the end of the journey, the ship went off course and ran aground near the coast of New Jersey but without damage. Soon after its return to Europe a second passage on the same route followed, which ended with the ship's homecoming to Southampton, on 16 November 1899.

During the winter 1899/1900, Kaiser Friedrich remained in Hamburg where repairs were undertaken by the shipyards of Blohm & Voss, mainly for increasing the number of cabin passengers, as well as its cargo capacity. At the start of the new travel season, on 30 March 1900, the ship set off from Southampton to New York City. This departure marked the beginning of the most stable and successful period of the liner's operating life, since HAPAG was not interested in breaking speed records and since taking delivery of Deutschland was soon expected, the speed of Kaiser Friedrich was deemed more than sufficient by the company.

Over the next seven months, the ship had completed eight full transatlantic trips (Europe to United States and back), between Plymouth and New York City, out of which most of the eastbound crossings took less than seven days to complete. Kaiser Friedrich's best performance was recorded during its journey back from New York City to Plymouth, in August 1900, which lasted 6 days and 11 hours. According to the press, Kaiser Friedrich seemed to have found its appropriate home fleet, as she was traveling at speed levels equal to those of HAPAG's other ocean liners, such as Fürst Bismarck, Columbia and Augusta Victoria, while offering a more luxurious and sophisticated stay.

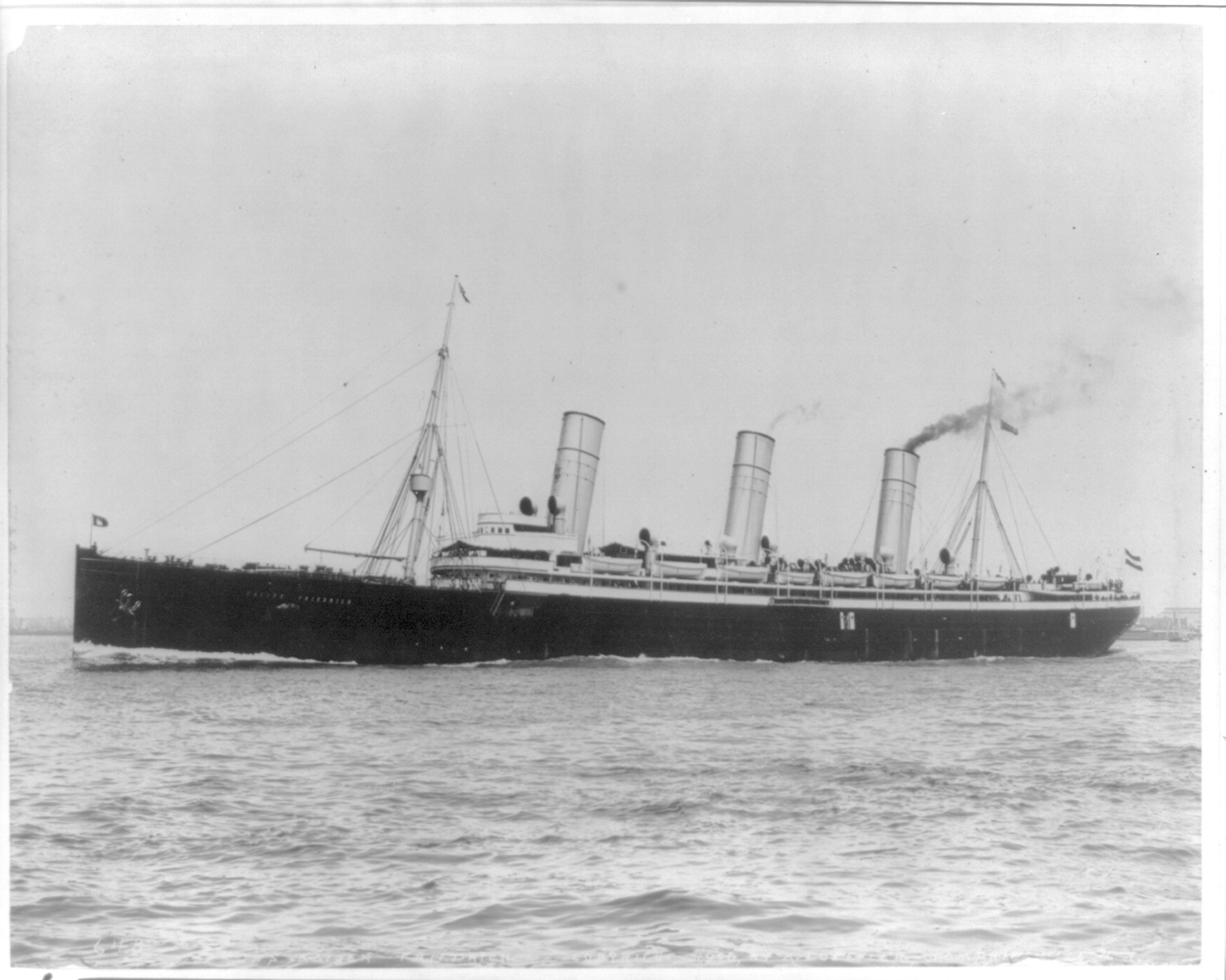
Kaiser Friedrich around 1900

On 30 June 1900, after her fourth passage, the ship arrived at the HAPAG quay at Hoboken, New Jersey, where the docks of NDL were also located. The vessel's arrival coincided with the great fire of Hoboken during which many of NDL's ships were destroyed, among them Kaiser Wilhelm der Grosse, which was not completely burned but had suffered major damage. During the fire, Kaiser Friedrich participated in several rescue operations rendering crucial assistance. The newspapers of the time, as well as the official shipping records, make explicit references about the heroism of the ship's crew.

In July 1900, the eagerly awaited Deutschland made its maiden voyage under the HAPAG flag from Hamburg to New York City. Within few months the ocean liner had won the Blue Riband speed trophy, reaching an average speed of 23 knots, thus taking the lead away from NDL's Kaiser Wilhelm der Grosse. HAPAG's dynamic entry into the higher class of transatlantic shipping, also meant the termination of Kaiser Friedrich's charter. Although the F. Schichau company had hoped, that after its successful integration into the HAPAG's fleet they would proceed with the ship's purchase, HAPAG had other plans and decided to expand its fleet by building new ships.

=== Hamburg-America Line's farewell ===
In October 1900, Kaiser Friedrich departed for its last transatlantic crossing from New York City to Hamburg where she arrived in November of that year; the ship was subsequently returned to her owner F. Schichau who in turn decommissioned it, remaining mothballed at the port of Hamburg for the next 12 years. Despite the fact that Kaiser Friedrich was a well built ship, with a service speed perfectly satisfactory to meet the requirements of most shipping routes, the negative reputation which had been created around the vessel, as well as its failure to fulfill the purpose for which it had been built, caused the ship's abandonment and eventually a misfortune that it most likely did not deserve. It was the first time -with the exception of the tragic first sailing and the subsequent ill fate of SS Great Eastern, that the possession of a ship of such class was considered by many as an "unnecessary luxury".

There is no doubt that the failure of Kaiser Friedrich to meet the term of the contract with NDL, which explicitly required that the vessel would reach the speed of 22 knots, was detrimental to the image of F. Schichau shipyards. Although NDL had ordered the construction of five new ships of around 6,000 GRT from the company to cover the Australian and Far East Lines and perhaps with the aim to alleviate the tension caused by their legal battle, the first large order from HAPAG was placed only about ten years after Kaiser Friedrich, in 1908, who ordered a middle-class 16,300 GRT vessel named SS Cincinnati.

Characteristic for the tarnished reputation and the financial damage caused by the failure of Kaiser Friedrich is the fact that in a commemorative album called "Die Schichau-Werke in Elbing, Danzig und Pillau 1837–1912", which F. Schichau issued in 1912 to celebrate the company's 75th anniversary, there is no reference whatsoever of Kaiser Friedrich. Only after a couple of years in the company's history book did a small reference of the ship appear, under her new name Burdigala.

=== Inactive years and purchase by Sud-Atlantique ===
Kaiser Friedrich remained mothballed in the harbour of Hamburg until 1910. This was a period when a newly formed Norwegian company, the Norwegian American Line (Norske Amerikalinje), was experiencing difficulties in trying to raise the initial capital essential for its establishment. The F. Schichau Company made a proposal to Norske to become a shareholder, promising to provide them with the capital they needed to survive, if they would agree to purchase Kaiser Friedrich. The proposal was accepted and the agreement reached a point where Norske gave the ship the name of Leif Eriksson, in honour of the Icelandic explorer of the 10th century. However, at the last minute Norske decided not to purchase Kaiser Friedrich, preferring to await the completion of ships they had already ordered. Two more years passed before a solution was found, a solution that finally made Kaiser Friedrich active again. Her salvation was called the Compagnie de Navigation Sud Atlantique and came from France in 1912, marking the beginning of the third period of the ship's history.

In March and April 1912, Sud-Atlantique was attempting to acquire a large, fast and impressive ship, which would reveal the aspirations of the company. They found all which they had been looking for in Kaiser Friedrich, which they purchased from F. Schichau on 1 May 1912 for 4,000,000 French francs, an amount considered to reflect one third of the ship's actual value. The ship was renamed Burdigala, in accordance with the practice of Sud-Atlantique to give its ships ancient Latin names such as Lutetia for Paris, Gallia for France and Burdigala for the city of Bordeaux, which was its base. According to maritime history expert Arnold Kludas, Burdigala was converted at the Blohm & Voss shipyards in Hamburg. In addition to the changes done in the layout and allocation of lodging space, adjustments were also made to the basic ship systems, such as fitting of new boilers. Moreover, the ship was painted white with Sud-Atlantique's coat of arms decorating the funnels- a red cock, symbol of ancient Gaul, since the Latin name for the cock is the same as the name for Gaul, Gallus.

The extensive repairs and upgrading of Kaiser Friedrich into Burdigala had taken longer than initially planned resulting in delayed delivery of the ship. Which was supposed to become operational on 22 September 1912. Realizing that under the circumstances Sud-Atlantique would not be able to fulfill the terms of the contract signed with the French Government, decided to charter SS Atlantique from Messageries Maritimes, with which the company finally managed to make its first scheduled trip on time.

After completion of the restoration work, Burdigala sailed from Hamburg to Bordeaux, where the ship was welcomed with great enthusiasm, considering that it was the largest and fastest ship in service at the South Atlantic at the time. The ocean liner would maintain this honorary title for a whole year. On 26 September 1912, the inclusion of Burdigala in the fleet of Cie de Navigation Sud-Atlantique was celebrated with a luxurious dinner on board. Nine days later on 5 October, Burdigala set off on its first journey with Buenos Aires as its final destination, flying the flag of Sud-Atlantique on her mast.

Although the trip had gone on uneventfully, during its return the ship experienced some mechanical problems which resulted in dry docking for additional repair work upon its arrival at Bordeaux. For the time that Burdigala had remained inactive, Cie Sud-Atlantique was forced to replace the ship with SS La Gascogne, a ship they had chartered from the French Line. This fact combined with Burdigala's enormous coal consumption, led the Sud-Atlantique to the conclusion that the relation between the high operation cost of this lavish ship and the earnings derived was not profitable for the company. Nevertheless, Sud-Atlantique had to wait further until the delivery of the new ships they had ordered before being in a position to withdraw the cost-ineffective Burdigala from its fleet.

On 10 November 1912, Burdigala embarked on her second trip. This time the ship managed to remain on track without any major problems, apart from grounding on a sandy shore of the river Garonne at the port of Bordeaux, following the dragging of the ship's anchors. Over the short period of time that Burdigala served the southern Atlantic line, she evolved into a rather distinguished persona of maritime communications between mainland France and South America. In some depictions, Burdigala is shown with its hull painted white, which coincided with the ship's "white period", a phase when she had first begun her career under the ownership of Cie Sud-Atlantique; on other photos the hull is painted black with a white strip around the gunwale. The latter refers to the second half of the year 1913, when the decision was made for all Cie Sud-Atlatique's vessels to be painted in this way.

On 1 November 1913, Burdigala was decommissioned and the vessel remained mothballed yet again at the port of Bordeaux until the outbreak of the First World War.

=== World War I ===
Immediately after the start of the First World War and the general mobilization, which France declared on 3 August 1914, many ships of the merchant fleet were commandeered by the French government. Among them were also ships of Compagnie de Navigation Sud-Atlantique. Burdigala was called for war service on 18 August 1914. The French government initially used Burdigala as a simple troop carrier in service from the French Mediterranean city of Toulon to the Dardanelles and Thessaloniki in northern Greece. In December 1915 Burdigala was designated as an auxiliary cruiser and equipped with quick-firing guns and four 140 mm caliber (5.5-inch) cannons, which were placed in pairs, at the bow and stern.

From 1915 to 1916, up to her time of sinking, the ship continued to carry troops to the Dardanelles and Thessaloniki, which was the base of the Allied forces. The route followed from Toulon passing south of Sardinia and Sicily, and with a first stop in La Valletta, Malta, continuing and rounding the Cape Malea on to Piraeus and from there through the Kea Channel to the Thessaloniki port. At this point Greece, until the declaration of war against the combined German, Austro-Hungarian, Bulgarian and Turkish forces on 25 November 1916 by the Eleftherios Venizelos government, had remained neutral and any actions on its territory and seas was the case, at least theoretically, among those forces engaged in the war.

== Sinking ==
On 13 November 1916 the ship sailed empty from Thessaloniki destined for Toulon, for loading more troops and war materials. The next day, 14 November 1916, at 10:45 in the morning, while the ship was about 2 nautical miles (3.7 km; 2.3 mi) southwest off Kea, Greece, a midship explosion blasted on the starboard side which flooded the engine area. The ship took on a 4 degrees list and the captain thought that the ship would sink within 20 minutes. The situation changed as water penetrated into the second boiler room ahead of the engines. Burdigala's list increased and the captain ordered the crew to abandon ship. Fifteen minutes after the "abandon ship" order was given, Burdigala was broken in two by a second explosion and sank off the northwest coast of Kea to a depth of 70 m (230 ft).

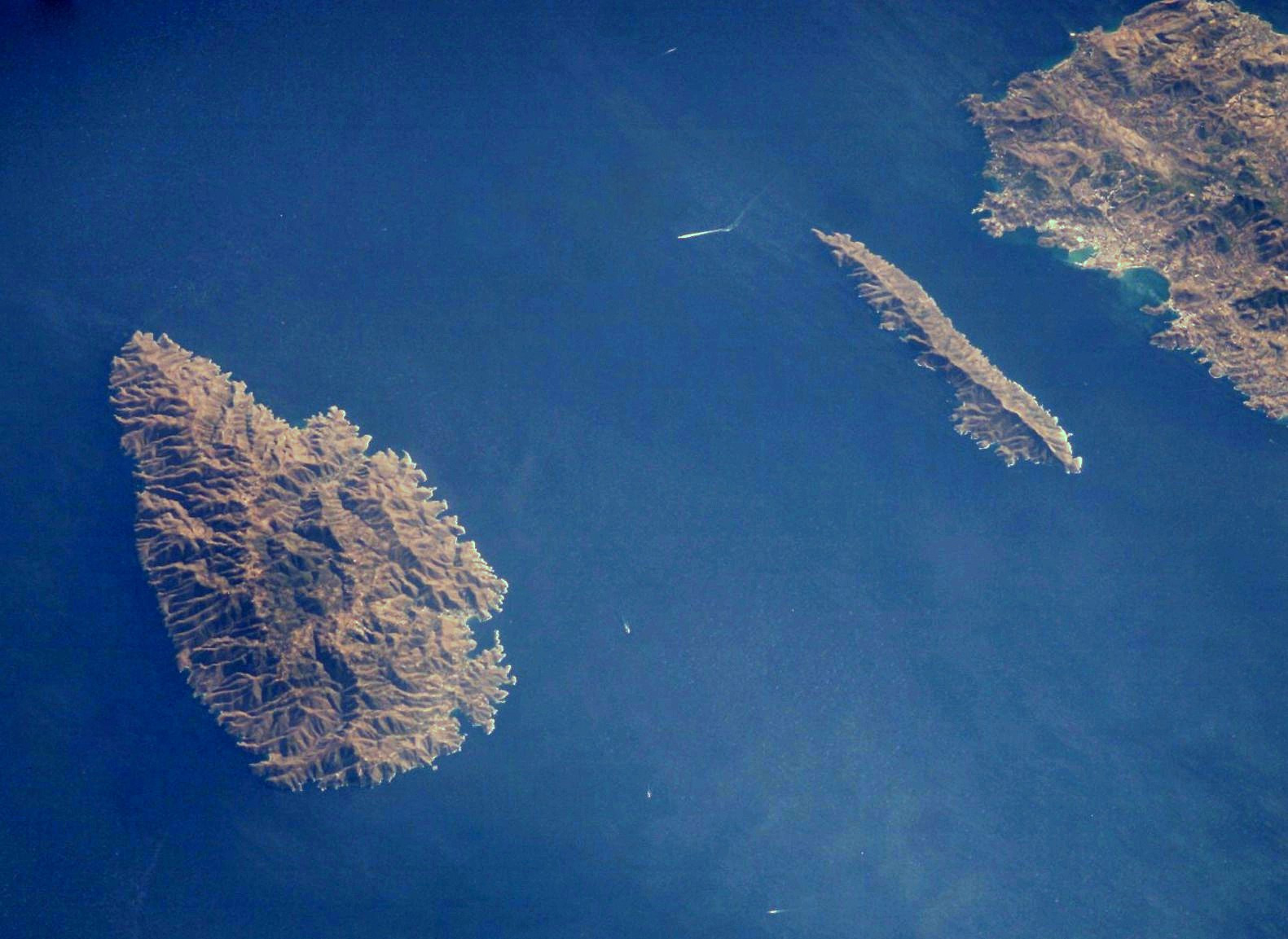
The channel between Kea (left) and Makronisos where Burdigala sank

The survivors of Burdigala were rescued by the British destroyer HMS Rattlesnake and were transported that same afternoon to Piraeus. Later they were transferred to the French flagship, the battleship Provence, and first aid services were provided. According to eyewitness reports, the statement by the commanding officer of the auxiliary cruiser Burdigala, Lt. Cdr François Rolland, there was only a single loss among the crew.

It was speculated that the ship did not hit a naval mine but was torpedoed, according to an eyewitness "The Captain, although he realized that the ship was sinking, he ordered his gunner to open fire against a submarine, her periscope still visible. Thus about 15 cannon rounds were fired, but is unknown if they hit the target". The official position of the French Government as submitted by 15 October 1919 which mentions that Burdigala, "torpedoed on November 14, 1916 in the Zea Canal, aborted after having cannoned the enemy's periscope until the last minute. His (referring to Capt. Rolland) crew gave a fine example of energy and self-sacrifice." Based on this position and the account of Cdr Rolland in the official report of the incident, that "the submarine dived immediately and the periscope disappeared soon after its detection". The French Government awarded in 1919 to Cdr François Rolland, to the second officer Ernest Mercier, to the Chief Engineer Auguste Richard and to other members of the SS Burdigala crew, the medal of honor Ordre de l'Armée.

== Wreck ==
The wreck lies close to Kea's harbour and lies upright on the seabed, depth is 60 m (200 ft) at the deck.
