= SS Lutetia =

1913 French ocean liner

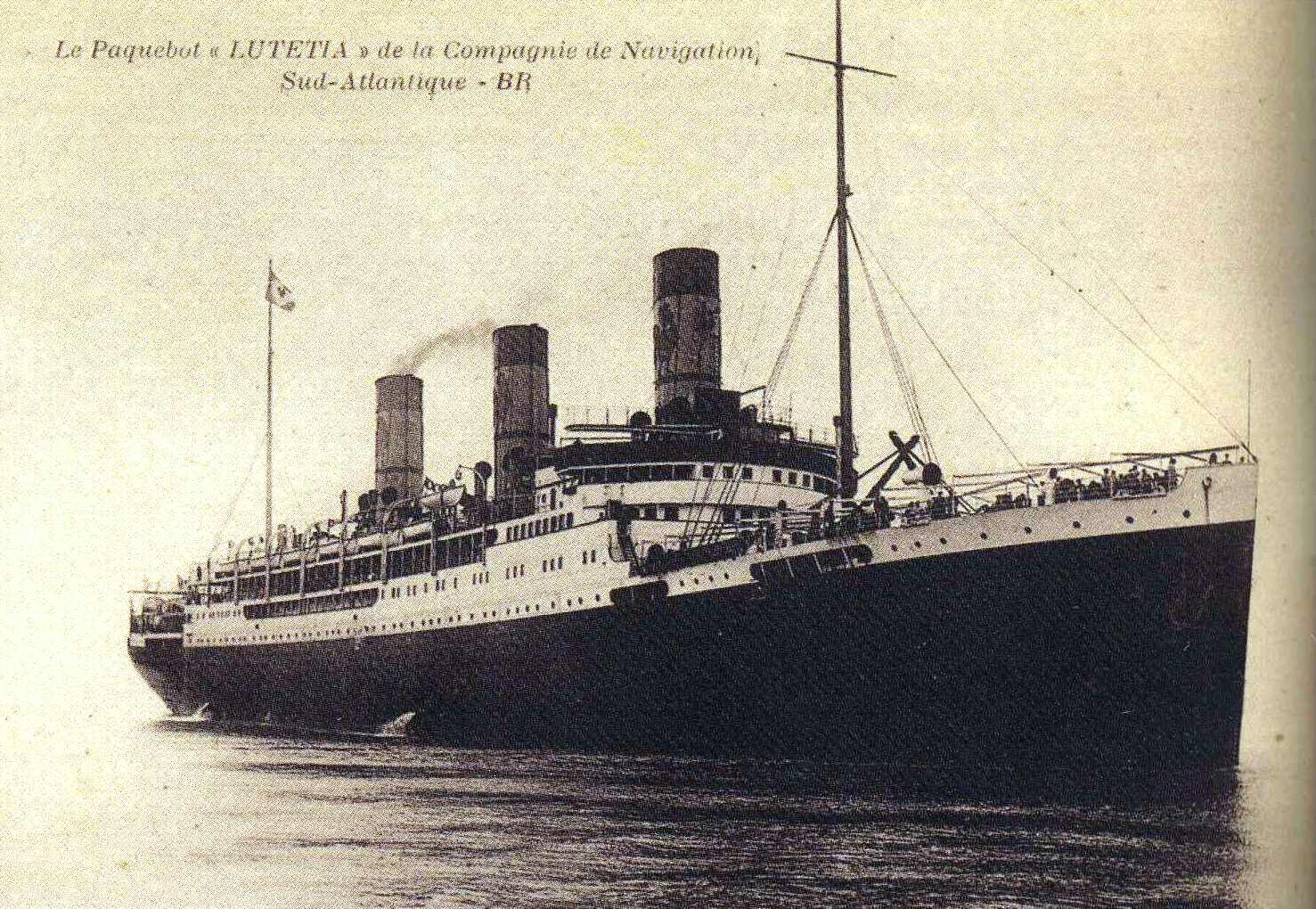
- Lutetia

History

France
- Name: Lutetia
- Namesake: Lutetia
- Owner: Cie de Navigation Sud-Atlantique
- Operator: Cie de Navigation Sud-Atlantique
- Port of registry: Bordeaux
- Route: Bordeaux – Buenos Aires
- Ordered: 1912
- Builder: Chantiers de l'Atlantique, Saint-Nazaire
- Laid down: 1912
- Launched: 23 March 1913
- Out of service: 1931
- Identification: code letters OLZT (until 1933); call sign FOTI (1934 onward)
- Fate: Scrapped 1938

General characteristics
- Tonnage: as built: 14,581 GRT, 5,681 NRT; by 1930: 14,783 GRT, 5,830 NRT
- Length: 176.4 m (578.8 ft)
- Beam: 19.8 m (64.9 ft)
- Depth: 11.1 m (36.4 ft)
- Decks: 7
- Propulsion: 2 × quadruple-expansion engines; 2 × exhaust steam turbines; 4 × screw propellers
- Speed: 20 knots (37 km/h)
- Capacity: 1,000 passengers total
- Crew: 345
- Sensors & processing systems: wireless direction finding
- Notes: sister ships: Gallia, Massilia

SS Lutetia was a steam ocean liner of the Compagnie de Navigation Sud-Atlantique. She was completed in 1913. Lutetia was the Roman city on the site of what is now Paris.

== Rationale ==
In 1911 the previous mail contract from the French state for routes to and from South America had been in the hands of Messageries Maritimes, but the new contract was awarded to Compagnie de Navigation Sud-Atlantique. As a condition for the contract and to ensure that enough ships were in service to provide a reliable mail service, the company was required to build four 18-knot passenger liners with a minimum length of 175 metres and provide six paquebots mixtes (passenger freighters). This would maintain a fortnightly mail service between Bordeaux and Buenos Aires. However, these arrangements were not confirmed by the French Parliament until 31 December 1911.

Orders were placed, the day after parliamentary approval was achieved, with the Chantiers de l'Atlantique at Saint-Nazaire for Lutetia and with Forges et Chantiers de la Mediterranee at La Seyne for a similar ship, Gallia, both to be delivered in 1913. The third ship was Massilia, was also built at La Seyne and was launched in 1914, but the First World War delayed her completion until 1920.

Chantiers d'Atlantique launched Lutetia on 23 March 1913. Her registered length was 176.4 m (578.8 ft), her beam was 19.8 m (64.9 ft) and her depth was 11.1 m (36.4 ft). As built, her tonnages were 14,581 GRT and 5,681 NRT. By 1930 they had been revised to 14,783 GRT and 5,830 NRT.

== Career ==
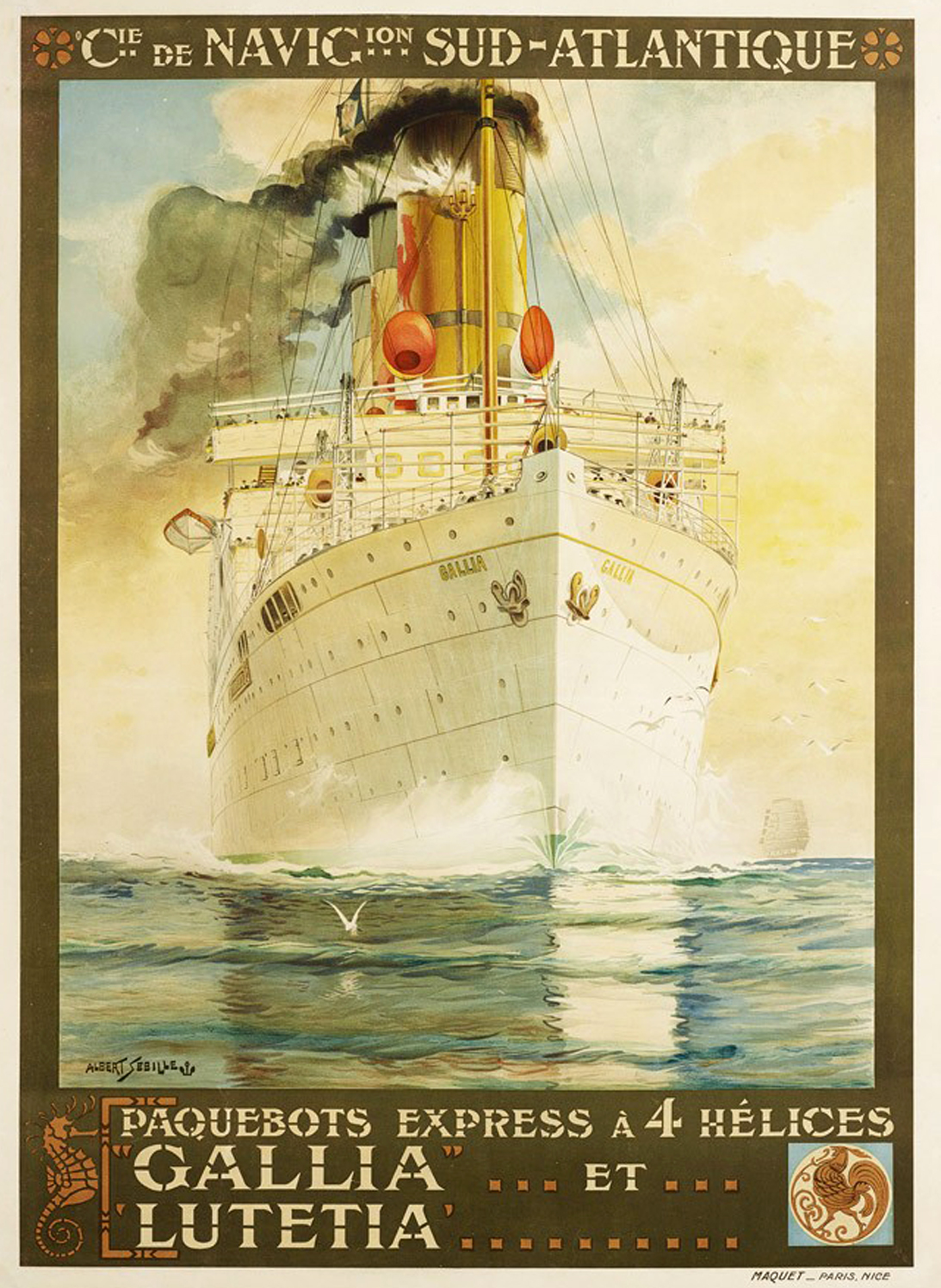
1913 poster advertising Gallia and Lutetia

In 1914, with the outbreak of the First World War, Lutetia was converted into a troopship in the Transport Force Newport News Division. In 1915 she was converted into an armed merchant cruiser, then a hospital ship and again as troopship in 1916 transporting Russian troops to Salonika. In 1919–20 she was refitted and in 1920 returned to civilian service.

The ship was use from 1920 as a running mate with Massilia on the route Bordeaux – Vigo – Lisbon – Rio de Janeiro – Santos – Montevideo – Buenos Aires.

On 7 December 1922 Lutetia struck a submerged wreck in the Gironde estuary and needed to be dry-docked for repairs.

In 1927 the ship was converted from coal-burning to oil-burning.

She made a total of 61 voyages to Buenos Aires between 1913 and 1931.

== Fate ==
In 1931, when L'Atlantique entered service, Lutetia was laid up. In 1933–34 her code letters OLZT were superseded by the call sign FOTI, but by then she was no longer in service. She was scrapped in England in 1938.
