= SS Massilia =

French ocean liner

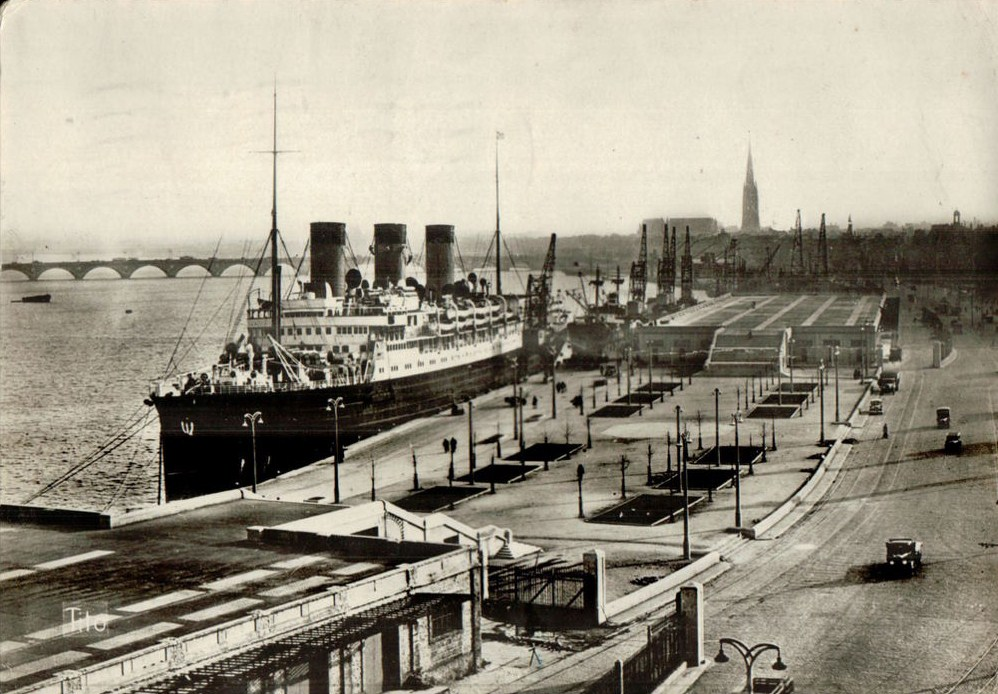
- Massilia at Bordeaux, about 1930

History

France
- Name: Massilia
- Namesake: Massilia
- Owner: Cie de Navigation Sud-Atlantique
- Operator: Cie de Navigation Sud-Atlantique
- Port of registry: Bordeaux
- Route: Bordeaux – Buenos Aires
- Ordered: 1912
- Builder: Forges et Chantiers de la Méditerranée, La Seyne-sur-Mer
- Laid down: 1912
- Launched: 30 April 1914
- Completed: 1920
- Out of service: 1942
- Identification: Code letters OMYH (until 1933); Call sign FOTN (1934 onward)
- Fate: scuttled 1944, scrapped 1946

General characteristics
- Tonnage: 15,363 GRT; 6,151 NRT
- Length: 175.9 m (577.1 ft)
- Beam: 19.5 m (64.1 ft)
- Depth: 11.3 m (37.0 ft)
- Decks: 7
- Propulsion: 2 × triple-expansion engines; 2 × exhaust steam turbines; 4 × screw propellers
- Capacity: 943 passengers total:
- Crew: 410
- Sensors & processing systems: wireless direction finding
- Notes: sister ships: Gallia, Lutetia

SS Massilia was an ocean liner of the Compagnie de Navigation Sud-Atlantique. She was launched in 1914 and completed in 1920. Massilia was the Roman city on the site of what is now Marseille.

== Rationale ==
In 1911 the previous mail contract from the French state for routes to and from South America had been in the hands of Messageries Maritimes, but the new contract was awarded to Compagnie de Navigation Sud-Atlantique. As a condition for the contract and to ensure that enough ships were in service to provide a reliable mail service, the company was required to build four 18-knot passenger liners with a minimum length of 175 metres and provide six paquebots mixtes (passenger freighters). This would maintain a fortnightly mail service between Bordeaux and Buenos Aires. However, these arrangements were not confirmed by the French Parliament until 31 December 1911.

Orders were placed, the day after parliamentary approval was achieved, with the Chantiers de l'Atlantique at Saint-Nazaire for Lutetia and with Forges & Chantiers de la Mediterranee at La Seyne for a similar ship, the Gallia, both to be delivered in 1913. Massilia was the third ship, also built at La Seyne. She was launched on 30 April 1914, but the First World War delayed her completion until 1920. As Massilia was completed later she had a more modern 1920s décor than her running mates, which were very pre-War in their fittings.

== Career ==
The ship was in use from 1920 as a running mate with Lutetia on the route Bordeaux – Vigo – Lisbon – Rio de Janeiro – Santos – Montevideo – Buenos Aires.

In 1927 she was converted from coal-burning to oil-burning.

In 1933–34 her code letters OMYH were superseded by the call sign FOTN.

=== Notable voyages ===
In 1922 Marcelo Torcuato de Alvear, then Argentinian ambassador in France, sailed on Massilia when he was recalled to become President of Argentina.

In 1928 an Italian migrant to Brazil, Giuseppe Pistone, strangled his wife, Maria Mercedes Féa, and tried to send her partly-dismembered body from Santos to Europe hidden in a suitcase aboard Massilia. The murder was discovered when the suitcase fell and was damaged when being loaded aboard the ship. The murder became known as the Trunk Crime.

When the Second World War broke out in 1939 Massilia was painted camouflage grey. When she left La Rochelle on 19 October 1939 she carried 384 passengers fleeing Europe, of which the largest contingent were Spanish Republicans who had previously taken refuge in France. The group included many artists, journalists, writers, academics and theatre figures. Amongst those aboard were the writer, playwright and copyist Salvador Valverde; the journalist, writer and editor Arturo Cuadrado Moure; the lawyer and author José Ruiz del Toro; the former parliamentarian of the Izquierda Republicana, Elpidio Villaverde; the painter and set designer Gregorio (Gori) Muñoz Montoro; the author Elena Fortún and her husband the painter and military officer Eusebio de Gorbea y Lemmi; the lawyer and legislator Pedro Coromines Muntanya; the sculptor Alberto López Barral; the academic Wenceslao Roces; the painter, set designer and ceramicist Manuel Ángeles Ortiz; the academic Ramón Martínez López; the graphic artists Andrés Dameson and Mauro Cristobal Artache; the painters Ramón Hidalgo Pontones and Esteban Francés Cabrera; the film director Luis de la Fuente; the playwrights Manuel Desco Sanz and Pascual Guillén; the journalists Antonio Salgado y Salgado, Clemente Cimorra, Mariano Perla, and Miguel A. Carreta; the engineer José Arbex Pomareta; the military pilot Juan Aboal Aboal; the film-maker José Fernández Cañizares; the actors Severino Mejuto and Ángel Giménez; the actress Maricarmen García Antón; the medical doctors Manuel Conde López and Miguel Cadenas Rubio; and the professor Carmen Santaolalla. She reached Buenos Aires on 5 November 1939.

On her return voyage, leaving Buenos Aires in mid-November 1939, she carried French reservists from Argentina back to France. The Royal Navy cruiser HMS Ajax escorted her at the start of the journey to protect her from German raiders.

In April 1940 Massilia was a troop ship in the Norwegian campaign.

In June 1940 she carried a large number of prominent politicians, including 27 members of the French Parliament, who fled from Metropolitan France to French North Africa after France capitulated to Germany and Italy. The group included Édouard Daladier, Pierre Mendès France, Georges Mandel, Cesar Campinchi, and Jean Zay.

Massilia was a troop ship between North Africa and France for the Vichy government. It then became a naval school for Chargeurs Réunis moored in the Étang de Berre, and then as a floating barracks for German troops in Marseille.

== Fate ==
As Allied forces advanced into France after the Normandy landings, German forces scuttled Massilia on 21 August 1944 to block the entrance to Marseille. After the war she was raised, then scrapped.
