= MS Aramis =

Ocean liner that became a French armed merchant cruiser and Japanese troop ship

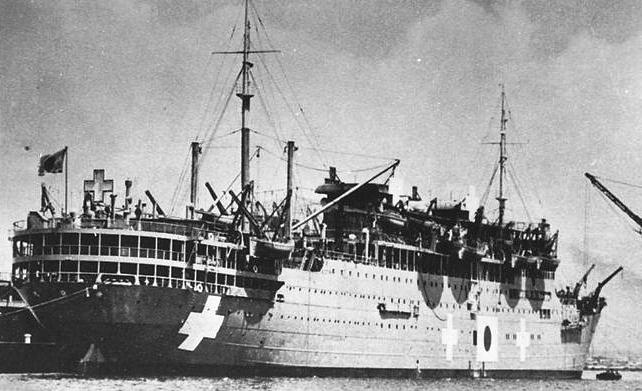
- Teia Maru as a repatriation ship in 1943

History
- Name: 1932: Aramis; 1940: X–1; 1940: Aramis; 1942: Teia Maru
- Namesake: 1932: Aramis
- Owner: Messageries Maritimes
- Operator: 1940: French Navy; 1942: Nippon Yusen Kaisha; 1942: Japanese Navy
- Port of registry: 1932: (France) Marseille; 1942: (Japan) Yokohama
- Route: 1932: Marseille – Suez – Far East
- Builder: Forges et Chantiers de la Méditerranée, La Seyne
- Launched: 30 June 1931
- Completed: 1932
- Commissioned: into French Navy, 1 March 1940
- Recommissioned: into Japanese Navy, 20 November 1942
- Decommissioned: from French Navy, 1 August 1940
- Maiden voyage: 21 October 1932
- Identification: code letters ORNA (until 1933); call sign FOBP (1934 onward)
- Fate: Sunk by torpedo, 1944

General characteristics
- Class & type: "nautonaphte" ocean liner
- Tonnage: 17,357 GRT, 9,990 NRT
- Length: 543.5 ft (165.7 m)
- Beam: 69.6 ft (21.2 m)
- Depth: 33.6 ft (10.2 m)
- Decks: 4
- Installed power: 1932: 2,490 NHP, 11,000 shp (8,200 kW); 1935: 15,600 shp (11,600 kW)
- Propulsion: 2 × screws; 2 × two-stroke diesel engines
- Speed: 1932: 16 knots (30 km/h); 1935: 19 knots (35 km/h)
- Capacity: passengers: 196 × 1st class, 110 × 2nd class, 60 × 3rd class, 1,183 – 1,402 × "rationnaires"
- Sensors & processing systems: wireless direction finding
- Armament: as X-1: 8 × 138 mm (5.4 in) guns; 2 × 75 mm (3.0 in) guns; 2 × 37 mm (1.5 in) guns; 8 × machine guns
- Notes: sister ships: Félix Roussel, Georges Philippar

MS Aramis was a Messageries Maritimes ocean liner that was launched in France in 1931. She was a sister ship of Félix Roussel and Georges Philippar. The three sisters were highly unusual in having square funnels. Aramis' interior was an Art Deco interpretation of Minoan design.

When France entered the Second World War, Aramis was converted into the armed merchant cruiser X-1. In August 1940 she was decommissioned. In 1942 Japan seized her under angary and renamed her Teia Maru (帝亜丸). She was a repatriation ship in 1943 and a troop ship in 1944, until a United States Navy submarine sank her. About 2,665 of her passengers and crew were killed.

== Design and building ==
Between 1929 and 1932 Messageries Maritimes (MM) had three new ocean liners built for its routes between France and the Far East. Ateliers et Chantiers de la Loire in Saint-Nazaire launched Félix Roussel in 1929 and Georges Philippar in 1930. The Société Nouvelle des Forges et Chantiers de la Méditerranée in La Seyne-sur-Mer launched Aramis on 30 June 1931 and completed her in October 1932.

Aramis' registered length was 543.5 ft (165.7 m), her beam was 69.6 ft (21.2 m)and her depth was 33.6 ft (10.2 m). Her tonnages were 17,357 GRT and 9,990 NRT. She had berths for 196 passengers in first class, 110 in second class, 60 in third class, and 1,183 to 1,402 "rationnaires".

The ship's Minoan décor was part of a programme by MM's president, Georges Philippar, to give MM's ships unusual revivalist décors from various ancient cultures, to get away from the usual 19th- and early 20th-century de luxe styles. In this case the designers went on a research trip to Crete. The "Neo-Aegean" design, based on Sir Arthur Evans' reconstructions at Knossos mixed with Art Deco, received much publicity. Tours of the ship were arranged at ports she visited on her maiden voyage.

The ship had twin screws, each driven by a French-built Sulzer ten-cylinder single-acting two-stroke diesel engine. The combined power of her twin engines was rated at 2,490 NHP or 11,000 shp (8,200 kW), and gave her a speed of 16 knots (30 km/h).

MM registered Aramis at Marseille. Her code letters were ORNA.

== French service ==
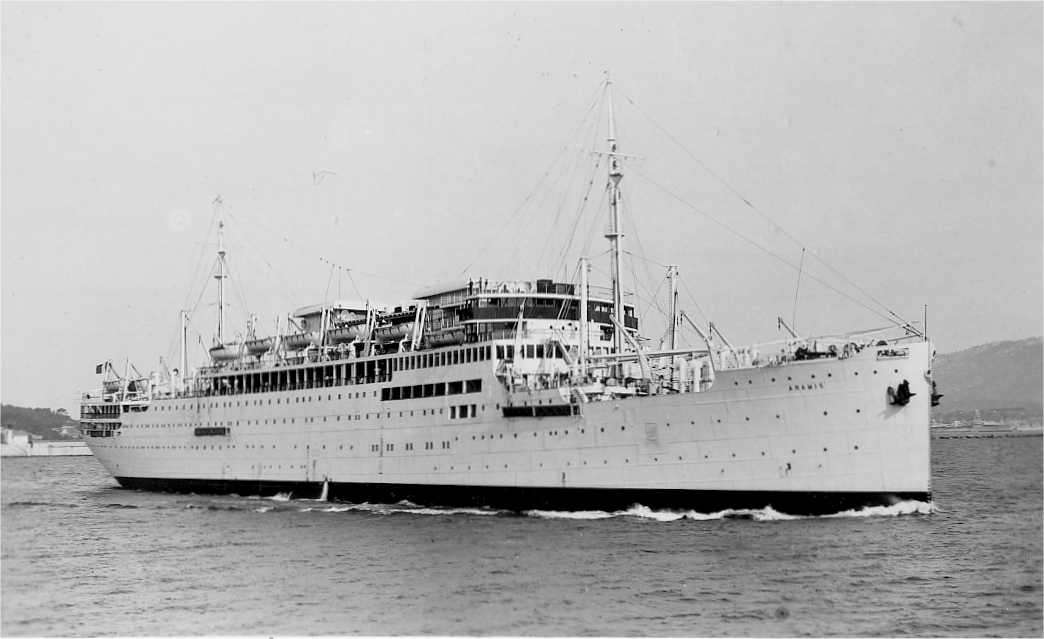
Aramis, about 1932

On 21 October 1932 Aramis left Marseille on her maiden voyage to Kobe via the Suez Canal. She called at Port Said, Djibouti, Colombo, Penang, Singapore, Saigon, Hong Kong and Shanghai.

On 22 June 1933 Aramis ran aground on Zhoushan. She was refloated, and the French cruiser Primauguet towed her to Japan.

In 1934 the call sign FOBP superseded her code letters. In 1935–36 Aramis' engines were supercharged. This increased her power to 15,600 shp (11,600 kW) and her speed to 19 knots (35 km/h). At the same time, Chantier naval de La Ciotat built her a new bow, which lengthened her by 30 feet (9 m).

On 4 September 1939, work to convert Aramis into an armed merchant cruiser was started in Saigon. She was armed with eight 138 mm (5.4 in) guns, two 75 mm (3.0 in) anti-aircraft guns, two 37 mm (1.5 in) anti-aircraft guns, and eight machine guns. On 20 January 1940 she left Saigon, and in February she reached Hong Kong, where she was dry docked. On 1 March she left dry dock, and was commissioned into the French Navy as auxiliary cruiser X-1. She patrolled the South China Sea.

On 22 June 1940 France capitulated to Nazi Germany and Fascist Italy. On 1 August 1940 Aramis returned to Saigon and was disarmed and returned to her owners. In January 1942 became a barracks ship in Saigon.

== Japanese service ==
On 12 April 1942, Japan seized Aramis under angary. On 2 June her French crew was disembarked. Officially, Japan chartered Aramis and ten other Vichy French. Japan paid MM 168,346 yen per month for Aramis. On 2 June she was renamed Teia Maru. Mitsubishi Heavy Industries at Yokohama dry docked her from 5 July until 19 November.

On 20 November 1942 the Imperial Japanese Navy requisitioned Teia Maru. From September 1943 she made voyages exchanging interned civilians with the Allies.

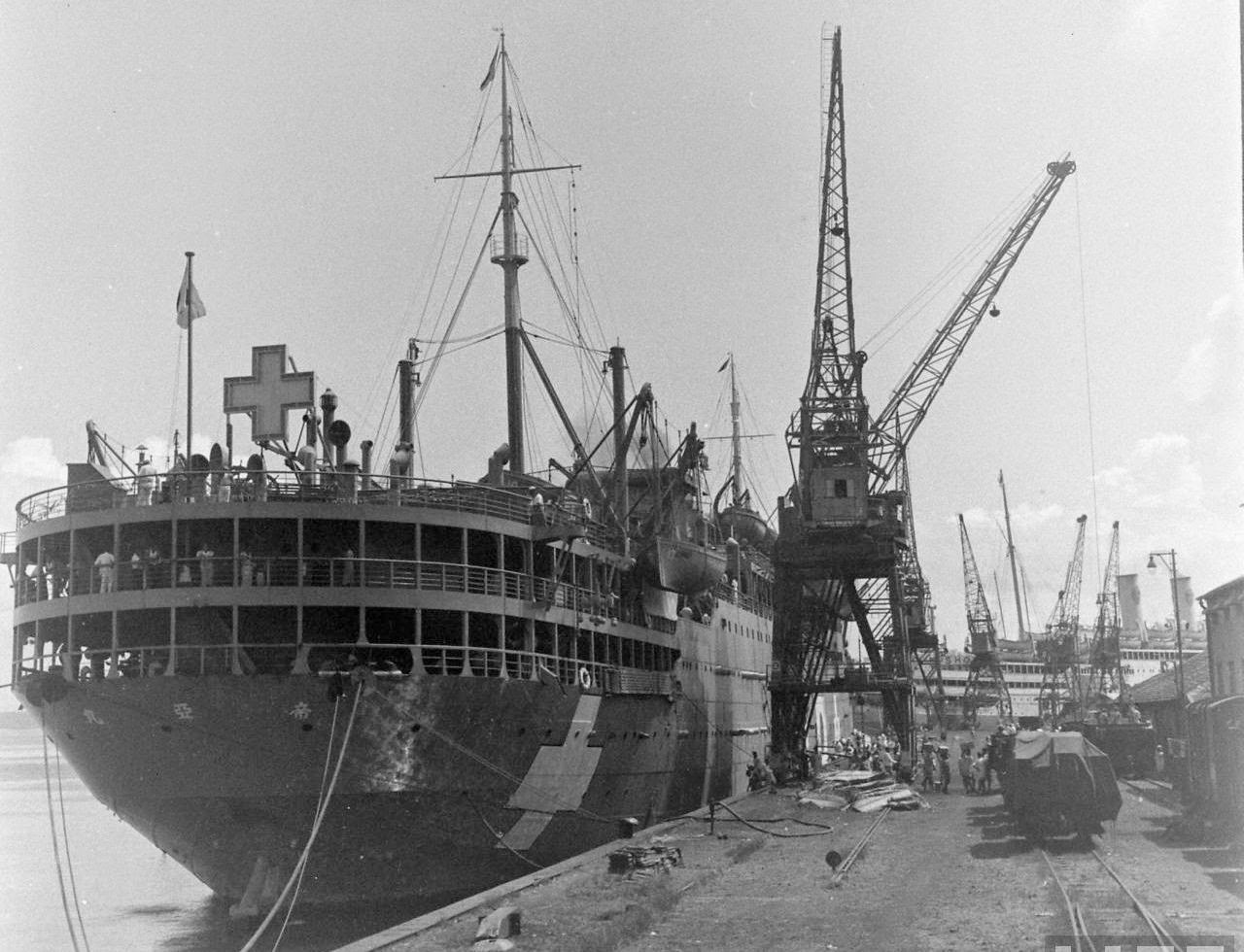
Teia Maru at Mormugao in Portuguese India

On 14 September she left Yokohama on the second Japanese–US exchange voyage. She carried 80 US repatriates from Japan. She embarked about 975 repatriates at Shanghai on 19 September, 24 at Hong Kong on 23 September, 130 at San Fernando, Philippines on 26 September, 27 at Saigon on 30 September, and others at Singapore on 5 October. She reached Mormugao in Portuguese India, on 15 October 1943 carrying 1,525 priests, nuns, Protestant missionaries, and businessmen with their families who had been stranded in areas captured by Japan.

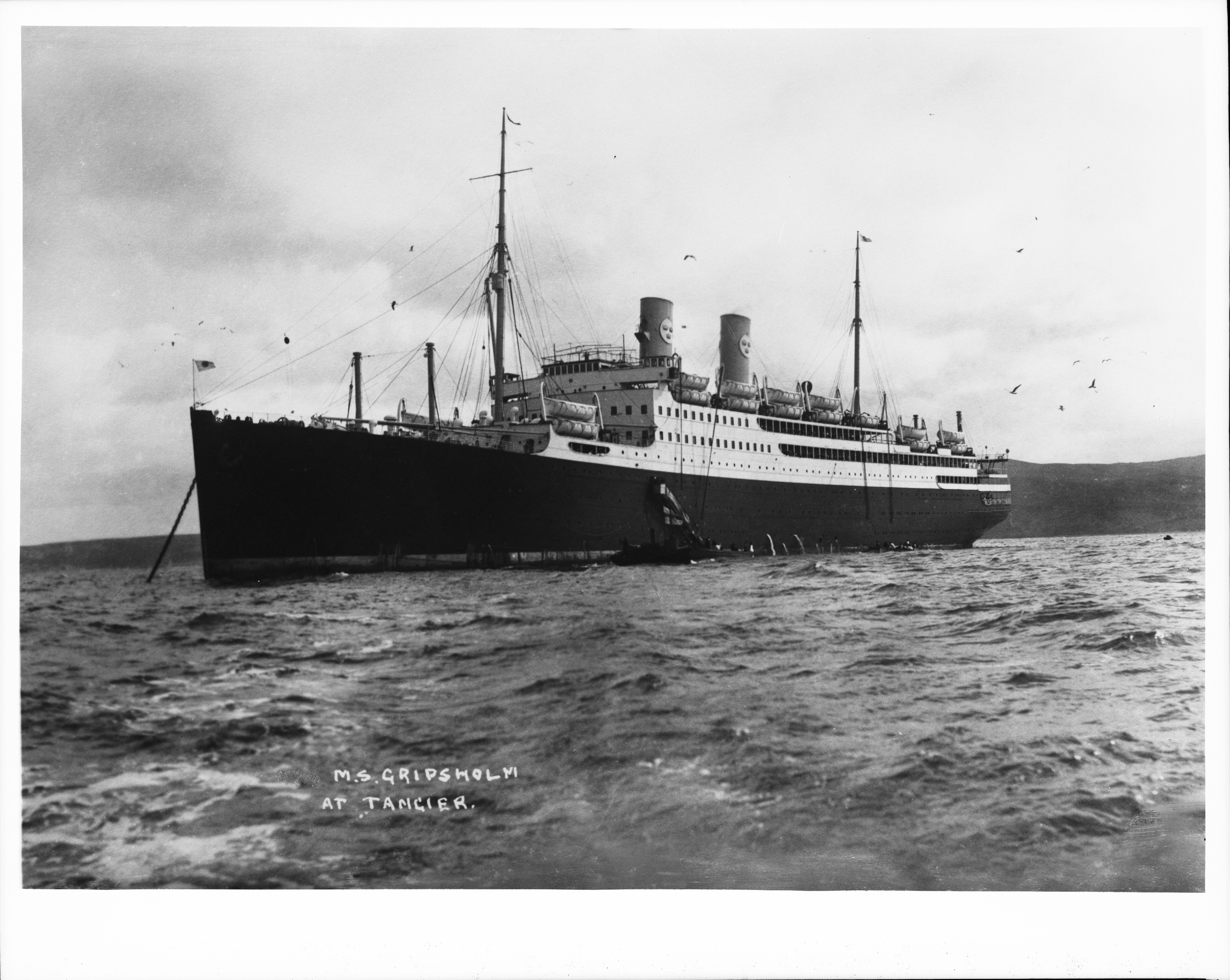
The Swedish liner Gripsholm

On 19 October, the neutral Swedish Gripsholm arrived carrying 1,340 Japanese officials and businessmen and their families. They were exchanged for 1,270 US citizens, 120 Canadians, and 15 Chileans, plus as UK citizens, Panamanians, Spaniards, Portuguese, Cubans, Argentinians, and nationals from other Latin American countries. 48,670 Red Cross parcels for interned Allied civilians were transferred from Gripsholm to Teia Maru for Allied prisoners of war and interned civilians in Singapore, Manila and Japan. Teia Maru left Mormugao on 21 October and returned the repatriated Japanese to Yokohama on 14 November.

On 1 January 1944 the Japanese Navy requisitioned Teia Maru again, this time as a troop ship. She sailed to Singapore with convoy Hi-41 in February 1944, and returned to Japan with convoy Hi-48 in March. She sailed again to Singapore with convoy Hi-63 in May 1944, and returned to Japan in June carrying about 1,000 Australian, British, Dutch, and other PoWs who had worked on the Burma Railway. 300 of these POWs were sent to Fukuoka Camp 6 in Orio, 350 POWs were sent to Fukuoka Camp 21 in Nakama, 100 Dutch POWs were sent to Fukuoka Camp 9 Miyata, and 250, including 150 Australian POWs, were assigned to work in Mitsui coal mines at PW Fukuoka Camp 17 in Ōmuta.

On 10 August 1944 Teia Maru left Imari Bay carrying 5,478 soldiers and civilians. Most of her military passengers were Imperial Japanese Army Air Service personnel. She was part of convoy Hi-71 carrying Operation Shō reinforcements to the Philippines. On 17 August the convoy entered the South China Sea from Mako naval base in the Pescadores. USS Redfish discovered the convoy that evening, and assembled USS Rasher, Bluefish and Spadefish for a radar-assisted wolfpack attack in typhoon conditions on the night of 18–19 August. Teia Maru was one of several ships torpedoed that night. She sank at position 18°16′N 120°21′E, killing 2,665 of her passengers and crew.

== Bibliography ==
- Blair, Clay (1975). Silent Victory. New York: J.B. Lippincott Company. pp. 676–680. ISBN 978-0397007530.
- Cressman, Robert J (2000). The Official Chronology of the U.S. Navy in World War II. Annapolis, MD: Naval Institute Press. p. 248. ISBN 1-55750-149-1.
- Lloyd's Register of Shipping (PDF). Vol. II.–Steamers and Motorships of 300 Tons and Over. London: Lloyd's Register of Shipping. 1933 – via Southampton City Council.
- Lloyd's Register of Shipping (PDF). Vol. II.–Steamers and Motorships of 300 Tons and Over. London: Lloyd's Register of Shipping. 1934 – via Southampton City Council.
- Miller, William H. Jr (1997). Picture History of the French Line. Dover Publications.
- Momigliano, Nicoletta; Farnoux, Alexandre, eds. (2017). Cretomania. Modern Desires for the Minoan Past. BSA – Modern Greek and Byzantine Studies. Vol. 3. London & New York: Routledge & École française d’Athènes. ISBN 978-1472474995.
- Ulanowska, Agata (30 October 2023). "review of: Nicoletta Momigliano & Alexandre Farnoux (eds), 2017, Cretomania. Modern Desires for the Minoan Past". Aegeus — Society for Aegean Prehistory. BSA – Modern Greek and Byzantine Studies. Vol. 3. London & New York: Routledge & École française d’Athènes. ISBN 978-1472474995.. Chapter 7 of the book deals with the ship.
- Media related to Teia Maru at Wikimedia Commons
