= SS L'Atlantique =

French ocean liner

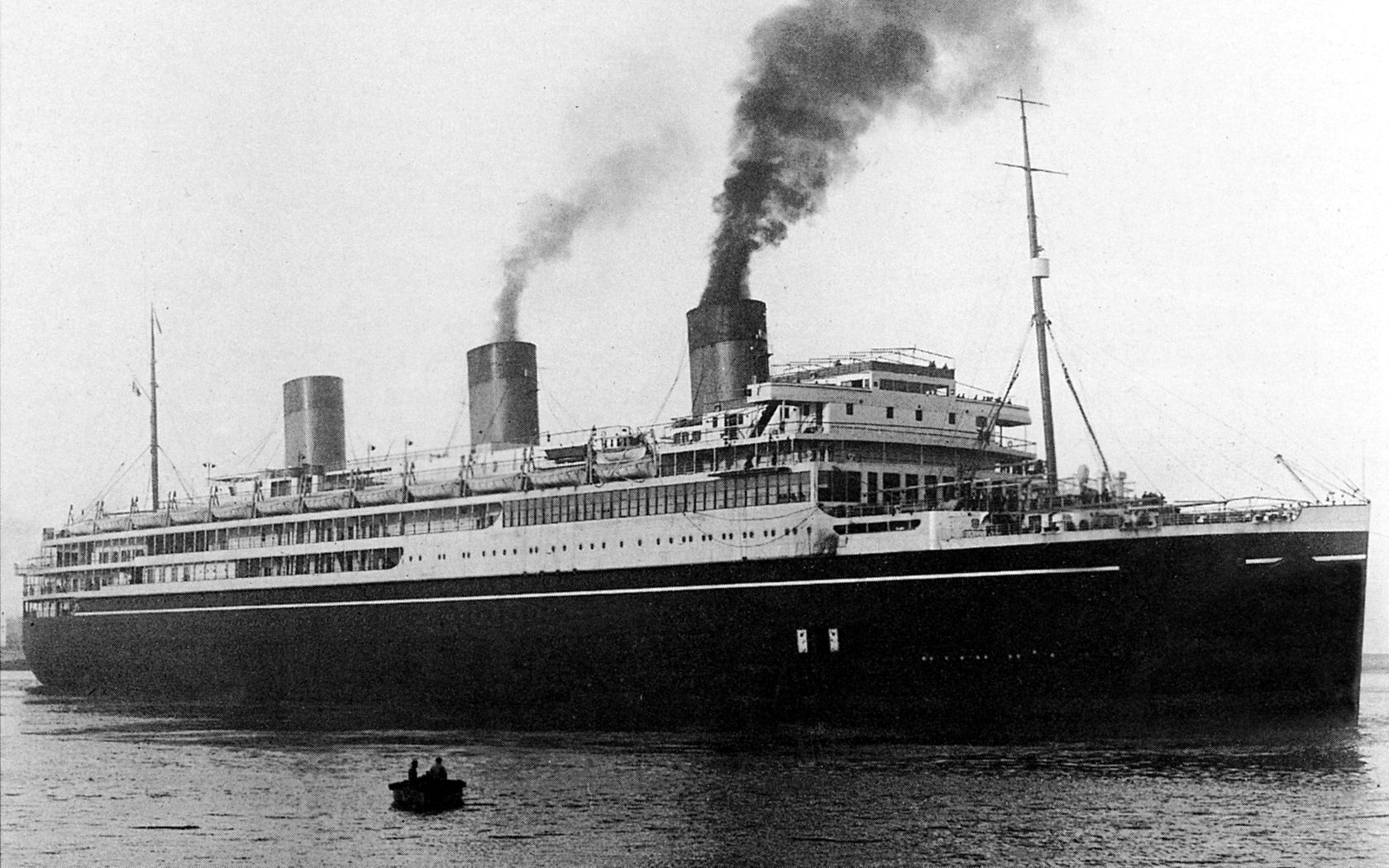

History

France
- Name: L'Atlantique
- Owner: Compagnie de Navigation Sud-Atlantique
- Operator: Compagnie de Navigation Sud-Atlantique
- Port of registry: Bordeaux
- Builder: Ateliers et Chantiers de Saint-Nazaire Penhoët
- Yard number: P6
- Laid down: 28 November 1928
- Launched: 15 April 1930
- Completed: 7 September 1931
- Maiden voyage: 29 September 1931
- Identification: Code letters ORWF
- Fate: Damaged by fire January 1933; Scrapped March 1936

General characteristics
- Type: Ocean liner
- Tonnage: 42,512 GRT; 22,099 NRT
- Length: 713.6 ft (217.5 m) p/p; 733 ft (223 m) o/a
- Beam: 92.0 ft (28.0 m)
- Draught: 29 ft (8.8 m)
- Depth: 57.6 ft (17.6 m)
- Decks: 4
- Installed power: 45,000 SHP
- Propulsion: Four sets of triple-expansion steam turbines driving four screws
- Speed: 21 kn (39 km/h; 24 mph)
- Capacity: 1,238 passengers: 488 first class; 88 in second class; 662 third class
- Complement: 663
- Sensors & processing systems: Wireless direction finding

SS L'Atlantique was a French liner owned by the Compagnie de Navigation Sud-Atlantique, a subsidiary of the Compagnie Générale Transatlantique (CGT). When completed in 1931 she was the largest, swiftest, and most luxurious liner on the route between Europe and South America.

Her career was cut short by a fire in 1933 that gutted much of the ship and killed 19 of her crew. She was scrapped in Scotland in 1936.

== Building ==
Ateliers et Chantiers de Saint-Nazaire Penhoët built L'Atlantique at Saint-Nazaire. Her keel was laid on 28 November 1928. She was launched on 15 April 1930 and completed on 7 September 1931.

The ship's length overall was 733 feet (223 m), and because of the shallowness of the Río de la Plata she was given a draught of only 29.5 feet (9.0 m) and unusually broad beam of 92 feet (28 m). Unusual for her time, she was designed with very little sheer and camber. She displaced between 40,000 and 42,500. Her gross register tonnage was 42,512.

The ship's main engines were four sets of triple-expansion steam turbines driving four propellers. They developed a total of 45,000 shaft horsepower and gave her a speed of 21 knots (39 km/h).

== Passenger accommodation ==
L'Atlantique had berths for 1,238 passengers, of which 488 were in first class, 88 in second class and 662 in third class, and 663 crew. All of her first and second class cabins were "outside" cabins with a porthole.

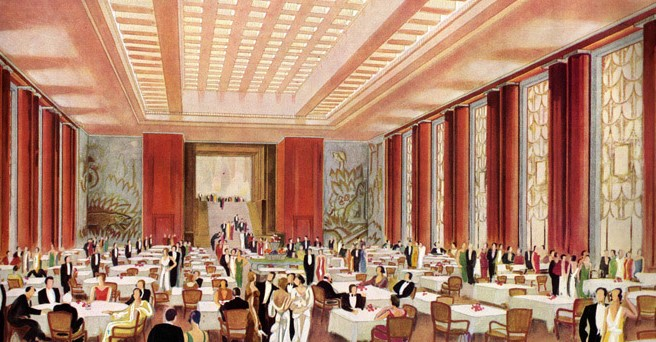
First class dining saloon

Unusually, the ship had a companionway up to 20 feet (6.1 m) wide running the length of each of her passenger decks. There was a foyer at the center of the ship three decks high.

The ship's interior décor was largely Art Deco. Furnishings were designed by painter Albert Besnard and architect Pierre Patout (one of the founders of the Art Deco style.), along with Messieurs Raguenet et Maillard. Decorations were largely made of glass, marble, and various woods, making for a more subdued atmosphere than on CGT ships such as Ile de France.

== Service ==
L'Atlantique made her maiden voyage between 29 September and 31 October 1931.

Her size, speed and luxury exceeded the level of demand between Europe and South America, and she was seldom fully booked. She relied on a substantial subsidy from the French government.

In 1932 the height of her funnels was increased by 16.5 feet (5 m).

== The Disaster ==
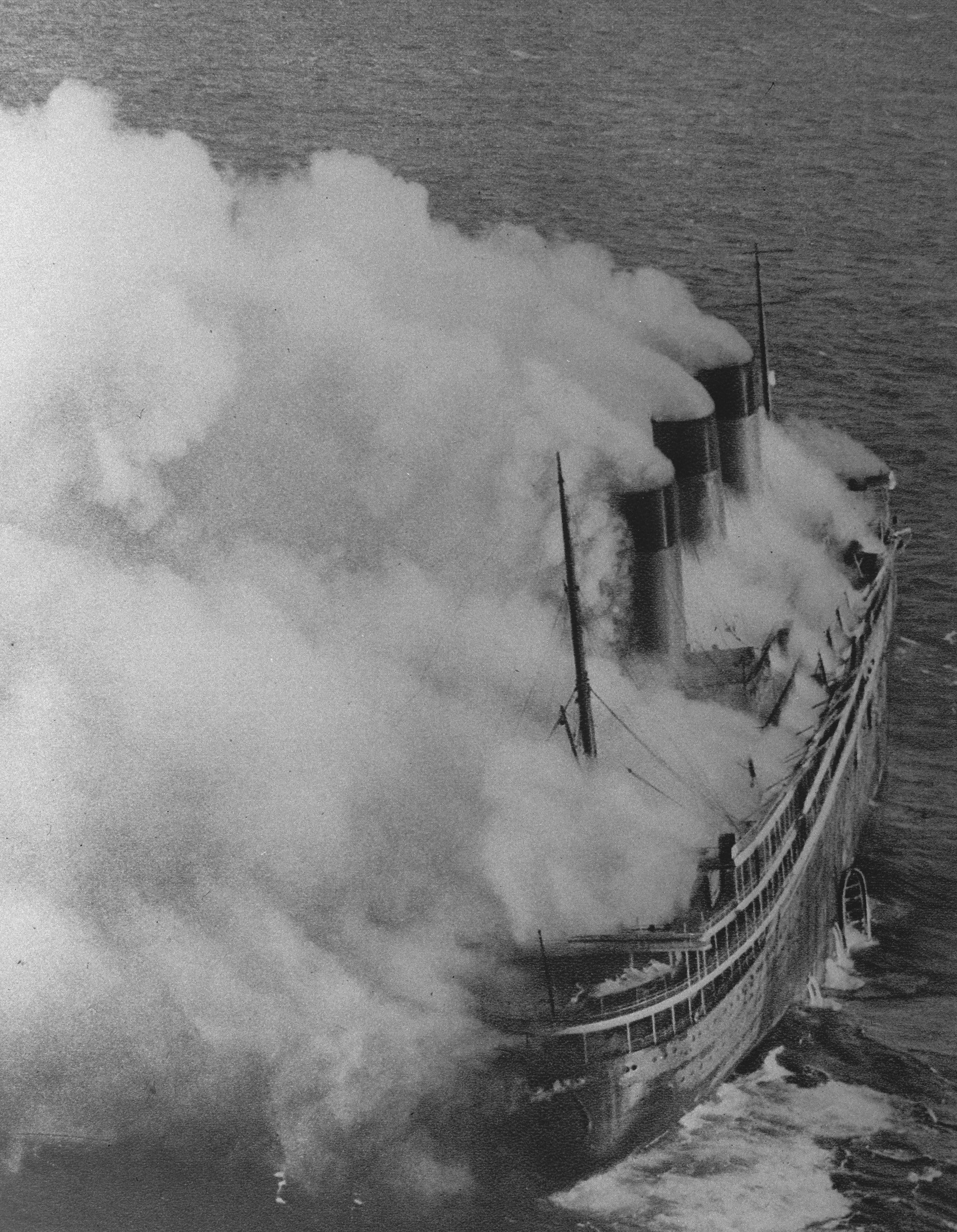
L'Atlantique on fire

On 4 January 1933, while traveling between Bordeaux and Le Havre to be dry docked and repaired, the ship caught fire about 25 miles (40 km) off Guernsey. The fire was believed to have started in a first class state room, and was discovered by the ship's crew at around 0330 hrs. The fire spread rapidly, killing 19 of the crew. By early morning the ship's captain, Rene Schoofs, ordered the crew of 200 to abandon ship.

One of the first lifeboats to be launched was lost when the ropes by which it was being lowered from the davits broke. Six or seven crewmen fell from the boat into the sea and drowned.

The ship's wireless distress message reached the French Navy bases in Brest and Cherbourg. Four cargo ships in the area went to assist. One account states that the Hamburg America Line motor ship Ruhr rescued some of the surviving crew. Another states that the Dutch steamship Achilles rescued the last crew to leave the ship, including men who were in the water.

Another account states that Thomas Henry Willmott, of Sunderland, first officer of the collier Ford Castle, was in charge of a lifeboat which went alongside the burning liner at considerable risk to pick up survivors that had been missed by other rescuing ships. For this the French Ministry of Merchant Marine awarded him the Medaille de Sauvetage and the owners of the L'Atlantique presented him with a gold watch.

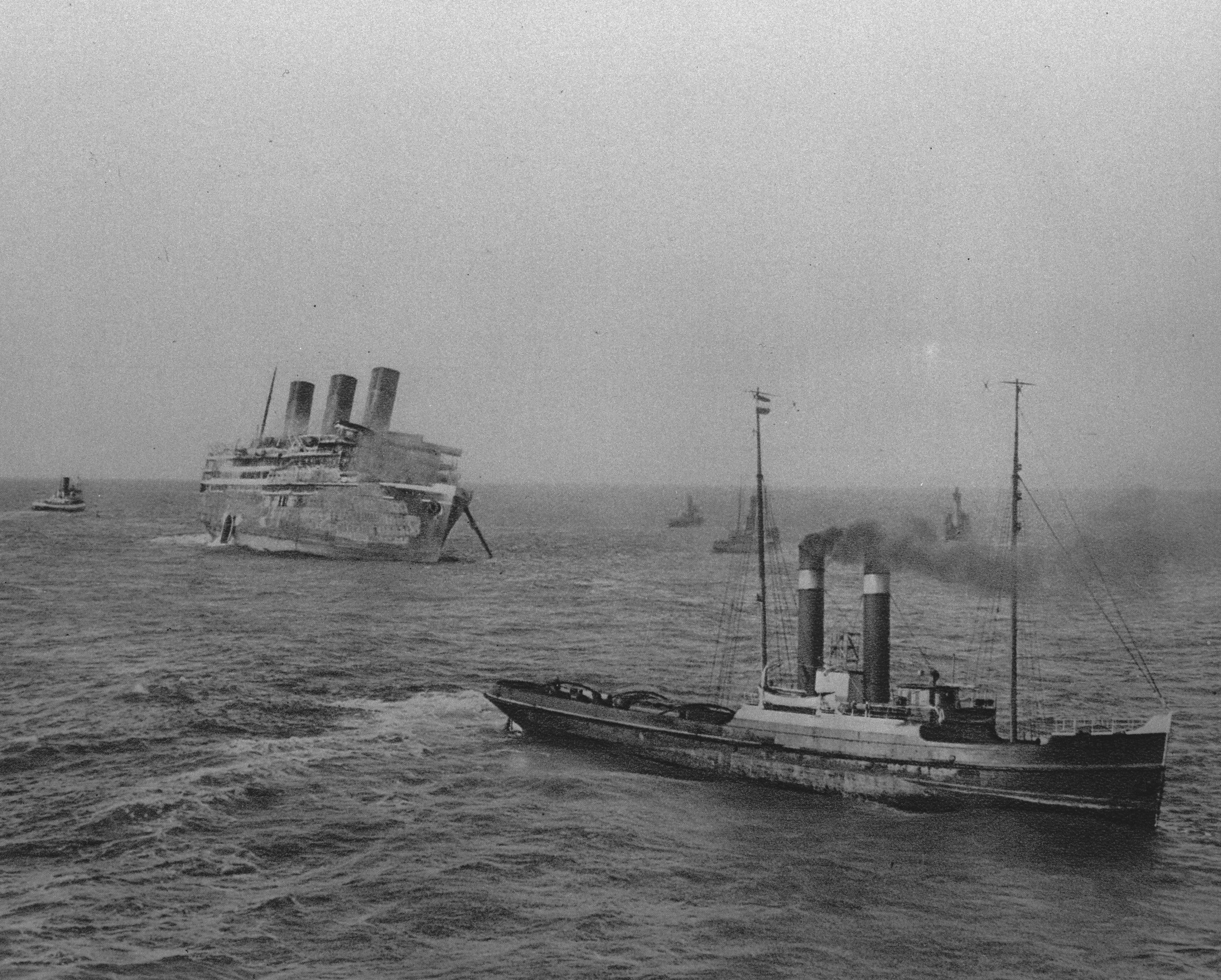
L'Atlantique (centre left) listing to port and surrounded by tugs

The fire buckled some of L'Atlantique's hull plates. By late afternoon she was listing 20 degrees to port. She drifted northeast, and on 5 January she came within 3 nautical miles (5.6 km) of the Isle of Portland on the English coast. Nine tugs towed the still burning ship to Cherbourg. The operation took 30 hours, during which several of the tugs were damaged.

== Aftermath ==
The New York Times claimed that on 5 January the French Ministry of Marine issued a statement saying the ship was considered a total loss. In fact the fire was not extinguished until 8 January and the ship's fate was not decided for another three years.

After the fire was extinguished, the bodies of five of her crew were found in the lower part of the ship. Only two were identifiable.

The fire had gutted her accommodation from A to F deck and her plates were buckled above the waterline, but her engines and boiler rooms were relatively undamaged. Her owners wanted the ship written off as a total loss but her underwriters contended that she was not beyond economic repair. The hulk remained at Cherbourg while a committee of experts was appointed, which obtained repair estimates from shipbuilders.

Eventually the underwriters agreed that L'Atlantique was beyond economic repair. They paid Compagnie de Navigation Sud Atlantique the equivalent of US$ 6.8 million or UK£ 2 million for the loss.

In February 1936 L'Atlantique was sold for scrap and towed to Port Glasgow, where the company of Smith and Houston started breaking her up in March.

Her owners used her insurance settlement to order a smaller but faster replacement ship, Pasteur, which was launched in 1938 and completed in 1939.

== A decade of ocean liner fires ==
L'Atlantique was one of five French ocean liners destroyed by fire within a decade. Three of those liners belonged to CGT. In May 1932 Messageries Maritimes' motor ship Georges Philippar had burned and sunk on her maiden voyage with the loss of 54 lives. The fire aboard L'Atlantique came only eight months later.

In 1935, the French government responded with new regulations. The use of wood was banned at vulnerable points such as stairs and lift shafts. Carpets and fabric wall-hangings had to be treated with fire retardants. Crews must be trained to fight fires, and any ship of more than 15,000 tons must carry three professional firemen.

Despite the new regulations, there were more fires. In May 1938 CGT's Lafayette was destroyed by fire in dry dock in Le Havre. In April 1939 CGT's Paris caught fire and capsized, also in Le Havre. And in February 1942 CGT's flagship Normandie caught fire and capsized in New York while being converted into a troop ship.

== Bibliography ==
- Dawson, Philip (2005). The Liner. New York: W. W. Norton & Company. ISBN 0-393-06166-3.
- Wilson, RM (1956). The Big Ships. London: Cassell & Co. pp. 97–98, 214–215.
- Streater, Les (2005). L'Atlantique: Queen of the South Atlantic. London: Tempus & Co. ISBN 978-0-7524-2837-6.
