= SPCA 80 =

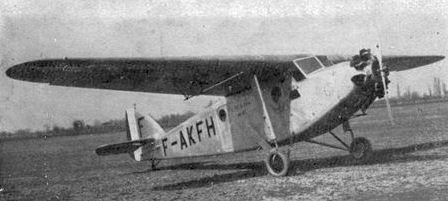

General information
- Type: Transport monoplane
- National origin: France
- Manufacturer: SPCA
- Number built: 2

History
- First flight: 30 March 1932

The SPCA 80 was a French transport monoplane designed by Société Provençale de Constructions Aéronautiques (SPCA) to meet a French government requirement for a single-engined colonial transport, specifically for police duties.

== Design ==
The SPCA 80 was a single-engined high-wing cantilever monoplane with a fixed tailskid landing gear. It had a cockpit for a crew of two and a cabin for four passengers. It was powered by a nose-mounted Gnome-Rhône 7Kb radial engine. Only a single example was built, registration F-AKFH.

The SPCA 80 was followed by a single example of a version powered by a Lorraine 9Na engine, designated the SPCA 81, which first flew on 25 April the same year. The SPCA 81 was later fitted with a Renault 9Ca engine, at which point it was designated the SPCA 82.

== Variants ==
- SPCA 80 — initial version with Gnome-Rhône 7Kb engine (1 built)
- SPCA 81 — version with Lorraine 9Na engine (1 built)
- SPCA 82 — version with Renault 9Ca engine (1 converted from SPCA 81)

== Specifications ==
Data from Orbis

General characteristics

- Crew: 2 (pilot, co-pilot)
- Capacity: 4 (passengers)
- Length: 11 m (36 ft 1 in)
- Wingspan: 15 m (49 ft 2.5 in)
- Height: 3.15 m (10 ft 4 in)
- Wing area: 31.50 m^{2} (339.07 sq ft)
- Gross weight: 2,030 kg (4,475 lb)
- Powerplant: 1 × Gnome-Rhône 7Kb radial piston engine , 224 kW (300 hp)

Performance

- Maximum speed: 220 km/h (137 mph, 119 kn)
- Range: 700 km (435 mi, 378 nmi)
- Service ceiling: 6,200 m (20,340 ft)
