= MS Gripsholm (1924) =

First diesel powered transatlantic passenger ship

- Gripsholm in her original black-hulled livery

History

Sweden
- Name: Gripsholm
- Owner: Swedish American Line
- Builder: Armstrong Whitworth & Co. Ltd.
- Yard number: 999
- Launched: 26 November 1924
- Completed: November 1925
- Maiden voyage: 21 November 1925
- In service: 1925–1954
- Fate: Sold to Germany, 1954

History

West Germany
- Name: Berlin
- Owner: North German Lloyd
- In service: 1954–1966
- Fate: Scrapped in 1966

General characteristics
- Type: Passenger liner
- Tonnage: 17,993 GRT
- Length: 573 ft (174.7 m)
- Beam: 74 ft (22.6 m)
- Installed power: Burmeister & Wain diesels
- Propulsion: Two shafts
- Speed: 16 knots (30 km/h; 18 mph)
- Capacity: 127 first class 482 second class 948 third class
- Crew: 360

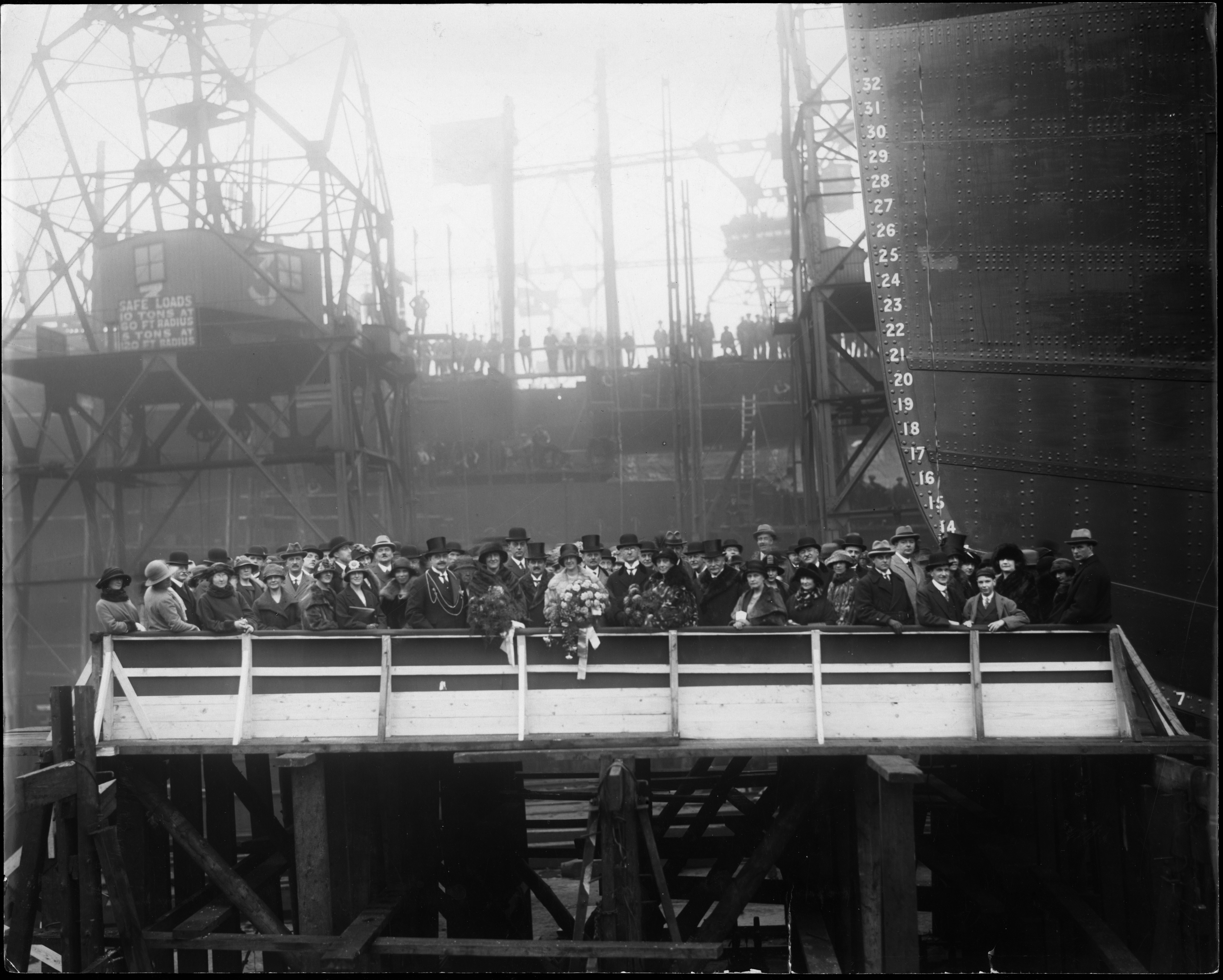
Ship christening on November 26, 1924

MS Gripsholm was an ocean liner, built in 1924 by Armstrong Whitworth in Newcastle-upon-Tyne, England, for the Swedish American Line for use in the Gothenburg-New York City run. She was of great historical importance as the first ship built for transatlantic express service as a diesel-powered motor vessel, rather than as a steamship.

== Initial service ==
From 1927 onwards, the Gripsholm made transatlantic passenger crossings and regular recreational cruises. Gripsholm was one of the first ships to call at the Canadian Pier 21 immigration terminal in Halifax, Nova Scotia, and made 101 trips with immigrants to Pier 21.

== Exchange and repatriation ship ==
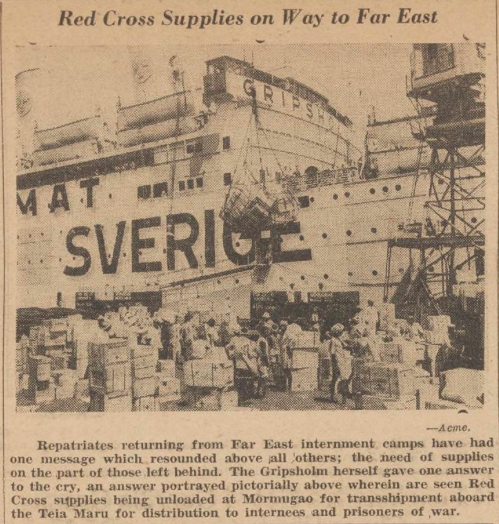
Gripsholm unloading Red Cross supplies in Goa

From 1942 to 1946, the United States Department of State chartered Gripsholm as an exchange and repatriation ship, carrying Japanese and German nationals to exchange points where she then picked up US and Canadian citizens (and British married to Americans or Canadians) to bring home to the US and Canada. She also made at least two voyages repatriating British and Commonwealth POW's in the spring of 1944 to Belfast and summer of the same year to Liverpool. In this service she sailed under the auspices of the International Red Cross, with a Swedish captain and crew. The ship made 12 round trips, carrying a total of 27,712 repatriates. Exchanges took place at neutral ports; at Lourenço Marques (now Maputo) in Mozambique or Mormugao (now Goa) in Portuguese India with the Japanese, and Stockholm or Lisbon with the Germans.

After the war, Gripsholm was used to deport inmates of US prisons to Italy and Greece.

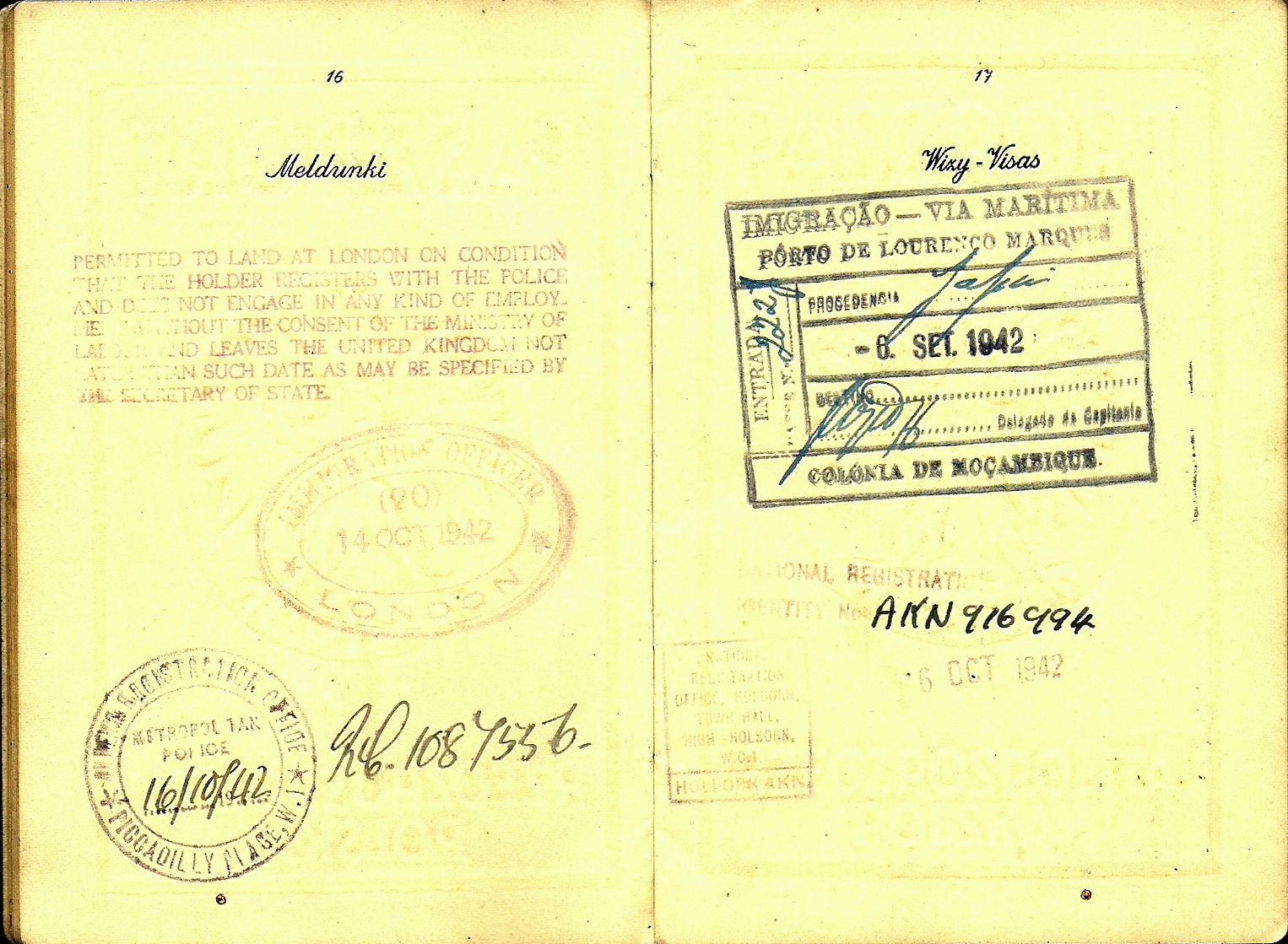
Image of a Polish passport used for repatriation from China to Africa in 1942.

== Post-war service and renaming ==
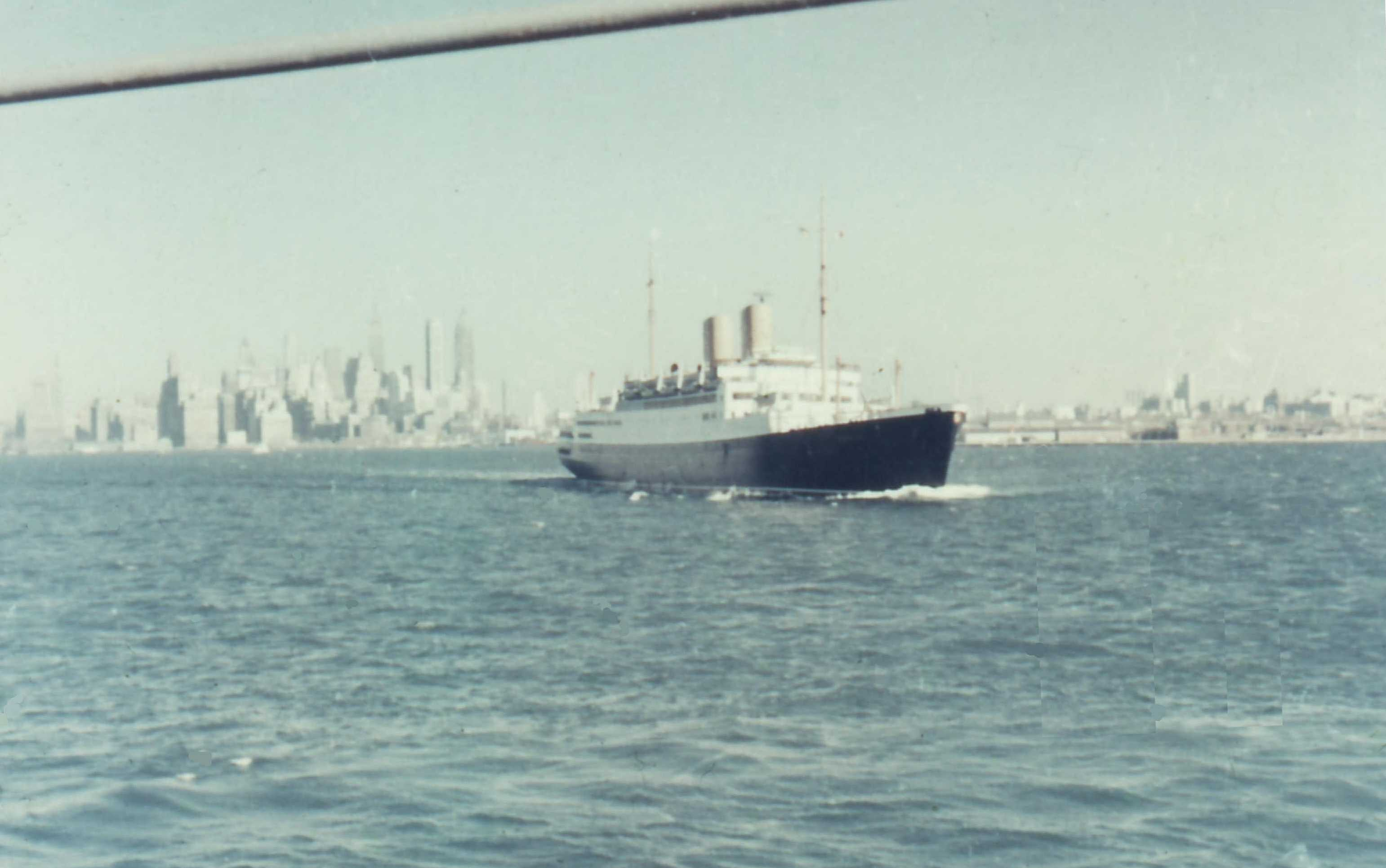
NDL passenger ship Berlin starting from New York City in 1957

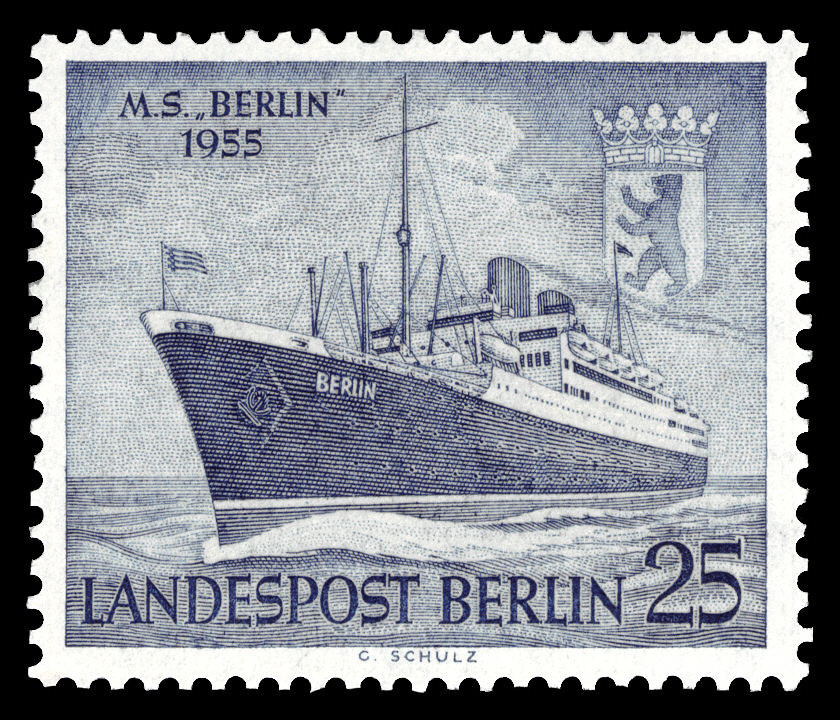
German postage stamp 1955 for issue in the year of renaming.

The Swedish American Line sold Gripsholm to Norddeutscher Lloyd in 1954, who renamed her MS Berlin. As MS Berlin, the ship resumed Canadian immigration voyages to Pier 21 in Halifax, making 33 immigrant voyages before the ship was retired. An image of MS Berlin arriving at Pier 21 in 1957 became the centre image of the newly redesigned Canadian epassport in 2012.

The ship was sold for scrap in 1966.

== Passengers of note ==
=== Regular service ===
- Ernest Hemingway, American novelist, short story writer, and journalist, sailed with wife Pauline Pfeiffer from Mombasa to Villefranch in early 1934, and again with her in January 1938 from Southampton to Nassau after his return from Spain reporting on the Spanish Civil War.
- Anton Koschany, Canadian news producer, W5, immigrated to Canada as a child on the sailing of March 22, 1956 from Bremerhaven, in company of his mother and sister.
- Count Zsigmond (Sigismund) Széchenyi, Hungarian hunter and writer, sailed from Mombasa to Villefranch in early 1934 after his hunting expedition in East-Africa.
- Greta Garbo, actress. Did a press conference onboard August 8, 1932.

=== Exchange and repatriation ship ===
- Joseph Alsop, not as a Naval Press Officer stranded in Hong Kong, but as a news reporter.
- Gilberto Bosques, Mexican Consul General in Marseille, credited with issuing 40,000 visas to fleeing Spanish Republicans, Jews and other persecuted individuals in 1939–1943, on board (with his wife and 3 children) the MS Gripsholm sailing from Lisbon March 6, 1944, after having been imprisoned at the Rheinhotel Dreesen in Bad Godesberg for one year.
- Cornell Franklin, former chairman of the Shanghai Municipal Council, was repatriated from Shanghai in 1943, taking the Gripsholm from Goa.
- Joseph Grew, US Ambassador to Japan, was repatriated from Tokyo in 1942, taking the Gripsholm from Lourenço Marques.
- Milton Helmick, judge of the United States Court for China, was repatriated from Shanghai in 1942, taking the Gripsholm from Lourenço Marques.
- Olive Ireland Hodges, longtime principal and missionary teacher at Yokohama Eiwa Girls School.
- Saburō Kurusu, Japanese peace envoy who was in the US when Pearl Harbor was attacked, was repatriated to Japan via Lourenço Marques in 1942.
- Kichisaburō Nomura, Japanese ambassador to the United States at the time of the attack on Pearl Harbor, was repatriated to Japan along with Kurusu in 1942.
- Pedro Inzunza McKay, Mexican diplomat, native of Mocorito, Sinaloa, subsequently Mexico's ambassador in Cuba and Brazil, on board the MS Gripsholm, with his French wife Marie Louise, sailing from Lisbon March 6, 1944, after having been imprisoned at the Rheinhotel Dreesen in Bad Godesberg for one year.
- Gregon A. Williams, Marine Corps Officer; Assistant Naval Attaché in Shanghai, was repatriated from Shanghai in 1942.
- May De Sousa, American actress famous for operetta; was repatriated from Chapei Civilian Assembly Center in Shanghai in 1943.
- Grace Drummond-Hay and Karl Henry von Wiegand, journalists for the Hearst newspapers, returned from a Japanese camp in Manila, Philippines in December 1943.
