= Société Provençale de Constructions Aéronautiques =

French aircraft company

- Industry: Aeronautics, defence
- Founded: France (June 12, 1925)
- Founder: Georges Philippar
- Defunct: February 1, 1937
- Fate: Merged
- Successor: SNCASE
- Headquarters: Paris, France
- Products: Aircraft
- Parent: Société Provençale de Construction Navale

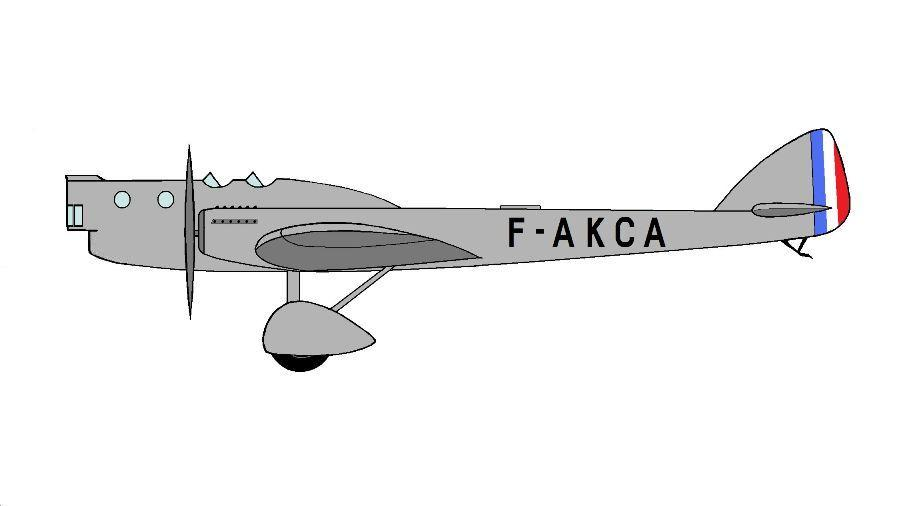
The SPCA 30, an ambitious project of the company that did not go into production.

The Société Provençale de Constructions Aéronautiques (SPCA) was a French aircraft manufacturing company, with its head office in Paris and its workshop in La Ciotat near Marseille.

== History ==
Founded by Georges Philippar in 1925, SPCA began as a subsidiary venture of SPCN (Société Provençale de Constructions Navales) shipbuilding company. Initially this aircraft builder was known particularly for its seaplanes.

None of the aircraft made by SPCA was built in large numbers. Part of them never even made it past the prototype stage, such as the 1928 SPCA 10, often known as the SPCA Paulhan-Pillard after its designers Louis Paulhan and engineer Pillard.

In the early 1930s SPCA built the SPCA Hermès 60T, a twin-engined flying boat, the small, single-engined SPCA 80 avion "de police coloniale" and the three-engined SPCA 90, an airliner and ambulance aircraft.

In 1936 SPCA was nationalized and merged in 1937 with Lioré et Olivier, Potez, CAMS and Romano in order to form the Société nationale des constructions aéronautiques du Sud-Est (SNCASE).

== List of aircraft ==
- SPCA Météore 63 The first SPCA aircraft
- SPCA 10
- SPCA 20
- SPCA 30
- SPCA 40T
- SPCA Hermès 60T
- SPCA 80
- SPCA 90
- SPCA 218
