= SPCA 90 =

Civil transport aircraft

90
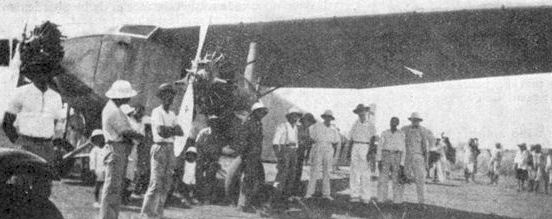

General information
- Type: Civil utility aircraft
- National origin: France
- Manufacturer: SPCA

History
- First flight: 8 December 1932

The SPCA 90 was a civil transport aircraft built in France in the early 1930s.

== Design and development ==
The SPCA 90 was a high-wing monoplane of conventional layout with a thick-sectioned, cantilever wing. The cabin was fully enclosed, and was large enough that the aircraft could be used as an air ambulance to carry two stretchers plus attendants. The fixed undercarriage consisted of divided main units and a tailskid. Only a single example was built (registration F-AKFJ), which saw service in Morocco.

In 1935, SPCA built an airliner version of the same design, designated 91T. The cargo area was fitted out as a passenger cabin with seats for eight passengers, a baggage compartment, and a lavatory. This was to be SPCA's last aircraft.

== Variants ==
- 90 — utility aircraft (1 built)
- 91T — airliner

== Specifications (90) ==
Data from Parmentier 1998, except as noted

General characteristics

- Crew: Three
- Length: 15.63 m (51 ft 3 in)
- Wingspan: 22.35 m (73 ft 4 in)
- Height: 5.03 m (16 ft 6 in)
- Wing area: 63.0 m^{2} (678 sq ft)
- Empty weight: 3,630 kg (8,003 lb)
- Gross weight: 5,250 kg (11,574 lb)
- Powerplant: 3 × Gnome-Rhône 7Kd , 260 kW (350 hp) each

Performance

- Maximum speed: 240 km/h (149 mph, 129 kn)
