= SPCA 60T =

General information
- Type: Transport seaplane
- National origin: France
- Manufacturer: Société Provençale de Constructions Aéronautiques (SPCA)
- Designer: Louis Paulhan and Pillard
- Number built: 1

History
- First flight: 1 August 1932

The SPCA 60T was a French transport seaplane built in the early 1930s. The SPCA 60T had a high-wing monoplane configuration with engines in tandem and all-metal construction.

== Specifications ==
Data from

General characteristics

- Crew: Four
- Length: 22.80 m (74 ft 10 in)
- Wingspan: 29.12 m (95 ft 6 in)
- Height: 7.00 m (23 ft 0 in)
- Gross weight: 9,650 kg (21,275 lb)
- Powerplant: 2 × Hispano-Suiza 12Nbr V-12 piston engines, 480 kW (650 hp) each
- Propellers: 2-bladed fixed pitch propellers

Performance

- Maximum speed: 200 km/h (120 mph, 110 kn)
- Range: 1,200 km (750 mi, 650 nmi)

== Bibliography ==
- Liron, Jean (September 1989). "Les SPCA: Le SPCA VII types 40T et 41T et le SPCA IV type 60 "Hermés"" [The SPCA Aircraft: The SPCA VII Types 40T and 41T and the SPCA IV type 60 Hermés]. Le Fana de l'Aviation (in French). No. 238. pp. 42–45.
