= SPCA 40T =

40T
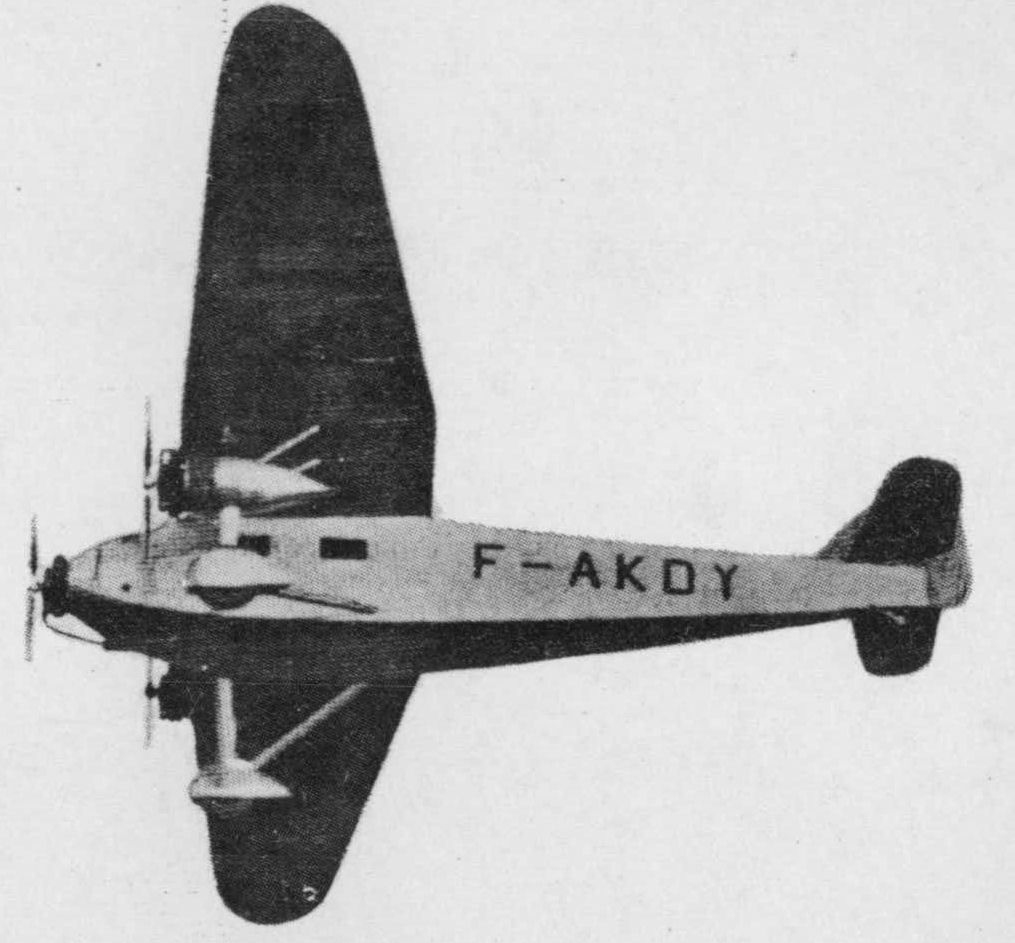

General information
- Type: Mailplane
- National origin: France
- Manufacturer: SPCA
- Primary user: Services Aeriens de Madagascar
- Number built: 3

History
- First flight: 21 December 1929

The SPCA 40T, also designated the SPCA VII, was a mailplane designed and produced by the French aircraft manufacturer Société Provençale de Constructions Aéronautiques (SPCA).

The 40T was a high-wing monoplane of conventional layout with a thick-sectioned, cantilever wing. Both the flight deck and cargo bay were fully enclosed, the latter could be adapted to seat up to five passengers. It was furnished with a fixed undercarriage that consisted of divided main units with spatted wheels along with a tailskid. Metal construction was used throughout the airframe.

On 21 December 1929, the type performed its maiden flight. A total of three aircraft were produced; the third being equipped with more powerful engines and the first two being subsequently rebuilt to the same standard. During the first half of the 1930s, it was operated by the Services Aeriens de Madagascar.

== Design and development ==
The SPCA 40T was specifically developed by the Société Provençale de Constructions Aéronautiques (SPCA) for use by the commercial sector. The company's design team were heavily influences by two critical requirements: economy and safety. Various aspects of economic operation were explored, such as the ratio of useful payload to horsepower. To this end, the aerodynamic design of several sections of the aircraft, such as the wing section, aspect ratio, and general lines, were shaped by the desire to minimise drag as much as was feasible to do so. The result was an aircraft with a relatively high degree of fineness.

In terms of its economics, the aircraft was designed to be fairly robust and easy to maintain. Furthermore, it was designed to be flown on a regular day-and-night schedule, even when presented with unfavourable operating conditions such as inhospitable weather. The aircraft featured extensive use of metal construction, not only throughout the airframe but also for the covering and the cantilever monoplane wing. Testing revealed the wing to maintain its favourable flight characteristics under practically any conditions, as did the surfaces of the aircraft's tail unit. The flight control surfaces were designed to be relatively undemanding in terms of upkeep, being rigid and mounted on ball bearings.

Various aspects of the engines were also designed to be economic. Each of the aircraft's three engines were installed upon tubular bearers, each of which were attached via four bolts, thus being relatively easy to detach and reattach as required. The cowlings present around each engine were designed to facilitate ease of inspection by ground crew. The airframe was manufactured in separate sections, such as the three sections that made up the fuselage, as well as its two-part landing gear, tail skid, tail surfaces, and wing tips. Amongst other benefits, this enabling any damaged part to be readily detached and replaced by a fresh counterpart. Accordingly, most incidents involving damage sustained by the aircraft would be relatively quick to repair.

In terms of safety factors, the two principal dangers identified were those of fire and engine failure. Accordingly, the aircraft was provision with numerous modern fire-prevention devices, such as automatic fire alarms and fire extinguishers. The fuel tanks, which accommodated up to 170 liters (45 gallons) within the wing and thus at a distance from both the engines and cabin, could dump fuel mid-flight. Moreover, the all-metal construction of the airplane hindered the spread of any fire. The danger posed by a single engine failure was effectively eliminated by the aircraft's ability to maintain horizontal flight with only two of its three engines running. Furthermore, during flight testing, the aircraft exhibited noteworthy levels of stability.

The aircraft's wing comprised a central rectangular section, a pair of tapering sections and two rounded tips. The biconvex section was relatively thick at the middle of the wing and became thinner towards the wing tips. It had a span of20m (65.62, ft.) and an aspect ratio of 7.28. The wing structure comprised a pair of lattice-type spars that were supported by ribs. The tapered sections were attached to the central section via four ball joints, which facilitated their removal and replacement when required. Both the leading and trailing edges (including the ailerons) were covered by relatively smooth sheet metal while the remainder of the wing covering was stiffened by a series of corrugations. The tail surfaces used a cantilever structure that lacked any external bracing. The horizontal empennage was somewhat elliptical, possessing an aspect ratio of 4.9.

The structure of the fuselage consisted of two transversely-braced side girders that were connected by bulkheads. Both the top and bottom consisted of longitudinal stringers that were supported by these bulkheads; in turn, the stringers supported the smooth sections of the exterior covering. The fuselage is made in three separable sections: the front part contained the cockpit, the middle section contained the cabin, and the rear part extended into the rudder post. The undercarriage comprised two separate parts, each supported by three struts; the vertical strut was equipped with a Messier-built shock absorber. The tail skid was also provided with an oleo-pneumatic shock absorber. The wheels were provided with brakes and had a track of 5 m (16.4 ft.). Alternative configurations included a seaplane arrangement that substituting the standard undercarriage for a pair of metal floats.

Power was typically provided by a total of three Salmson 9Ac radial engines, each being capable of producing up to 120hp. One engine was installed in the nose while the two others were wing-mounted. The central engine was mounted at the nose of the fuselage on a bearer which was able to be turned on its vertical axis. The side engines were mounted in streamlined nacelles that were attached to the underside of the wing. The aircraft could be powered by a total of three engines in the 120-150 hp range; in one optional arrangement, the central engine could be as powerful as 230 hp. The oil tanks were located behind the engines.

The aircraft was equipped to conduct routine night flights. The cockpit was fully enclosed and furnished with two seats set out in a side-by-side arrangement; the pilot was seated on the left while the navigator was on the right. The navigator's position was furnished with a radio set and various instruments for navigation purposes. The cockpit was accessed via a door on the right-hand side while a door on the left-hand side accessed the passenger cabin. The cabin could be adapted for the carriage of roughly 350 kg (772 lb.) of air mail or other freight; in a passenger configuration, it could carry up to four passengers along with a lavatory. It could also be set up as an air ambulance, carrying two stretcher cases, one seat for a medical attendant, a single table and a medicine chest. With this equipment, the airplane weighed around 2900 kg (6393.4 lb.) in flying order.

The first two aircraft, designated 40T, were followed by a single example, designated 41T; the latter was equipped with more powerful Salmson 9Nc engines and made its first flight on 12 December 1931. The type was acquired by the French Government. Services Aeriens de Madagascar operated the 41T between Tananarive and Broken Hill (where the route connected with Imperial Airways). Eventually, both of the 40Ts were fitted with this same engine, at which time they were redesignated SPCA 218.

== Variants ==
- 40T – initial production version with Salmson 9Ac engines (2 built)
- 41T – version with Salmson 9Nc engines (1 built)
- 218 – original 40Ts refitted with Salmson 9Nc engines (2 converted)

== Operators ==
- Services Aeriens de Madagascar

== Specifications (40T) ==
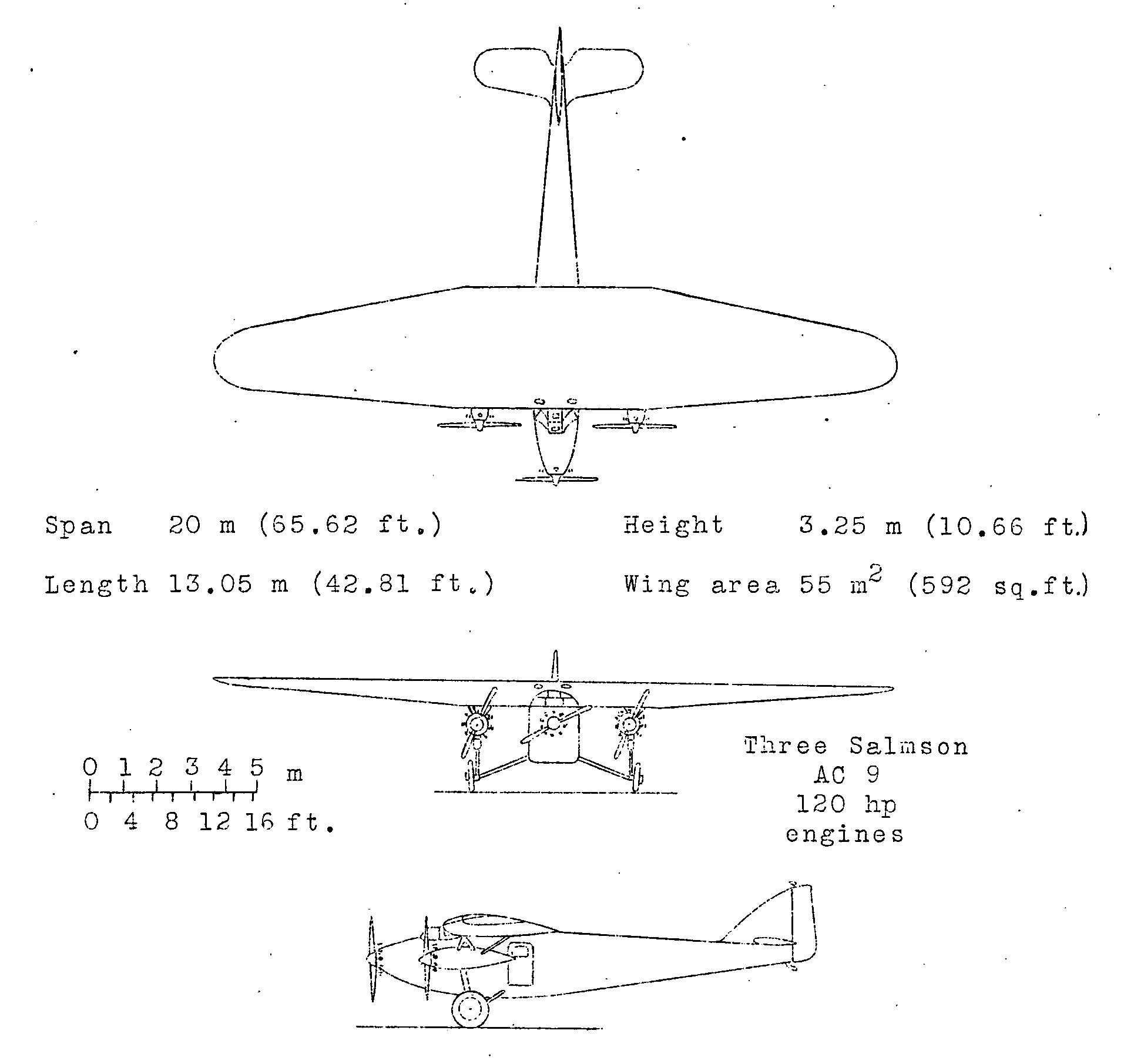
SPCA 40 T p3-view drawing from NACA Aircraft Circular No.143

Data from Aviafrance: SPCA 40T, National Advisory Committee for Aeronautics

General characteristics

- Crew: Two (pilots)
- Length: 13.18 m (43 ft 3 in)
- Wingspan: 20.00 m (65 ft 7 in)
- Height: 3.25 m (10 ft 8 in)
- Wing area: 55.0 m^{2} (590 sq ft)
- Empty weight: 2,161 kg (4,754 lb)
- Gross weight: 3,036 kg (6,679 lb)
- Powerplant: 3 × Salmson 9Ac , 90 kW (120 hp) each

Performance

- Maximum speed: 180 km/h (110 mph, 96 kn)
- Range: 600 km (380 mi, 330 nmi)
- Service ceiling: 5,950 m (19,500 ft)
