= SPCA 20 =

General information
- Type: Torpedo seaplane
- National origin: France
- Manufacturer: Société Provençale de Constructions Aéronautiques (SPCA)
- Designer: Louis Paulhan and Pillard
- Number built: 2

History
- First flight: 22 June 1928

The SPCA 20 was a French seaplane designed for torpedo bombing. It was a low-wing monoplane of all-metal construction.

== Specifications ==
Data from Aviafrance:SPCA 20

General characteristics

- Crew: Four
- Length: 18.62 m (61 ft 1 in)
- Wingspan: 26.22 m (86 ft 0 in)
- Height: 6.40 m (21 ft 0 in)
- Wing area: 123 m^{2} (1,320 sq ft)
- Empty weight: 4,300 kg (9,480 lb)
- Gross weight: 7,300 kg (16,094 lb)
- Powerplant: 2 × Gnome-Rhône 9Ae Jupiter 9-cylinder direct-drive air-cooled radial piston engines, 360 kW (480 hp) each
- Propellers: 2-bladed fixed pitch propellers

Performance

- Maximum speed: 180 km/h (110 mph, 97 kn)
- Range: 1,200 km (750 mi, 650 nmi)
- Service ceiling: 5,000 m (16,000 ft)

== Bibliography ==
- Espérou, Robert (July 1989). "Les SPCA: Le SPCA II type 20" [The SPCA Aircraft: The SPCA II Type 20]. Le Fana de l'Aviation (in French). No. 236. pp. 40–43.
