= SPCA Météore 63 =

Météore 63
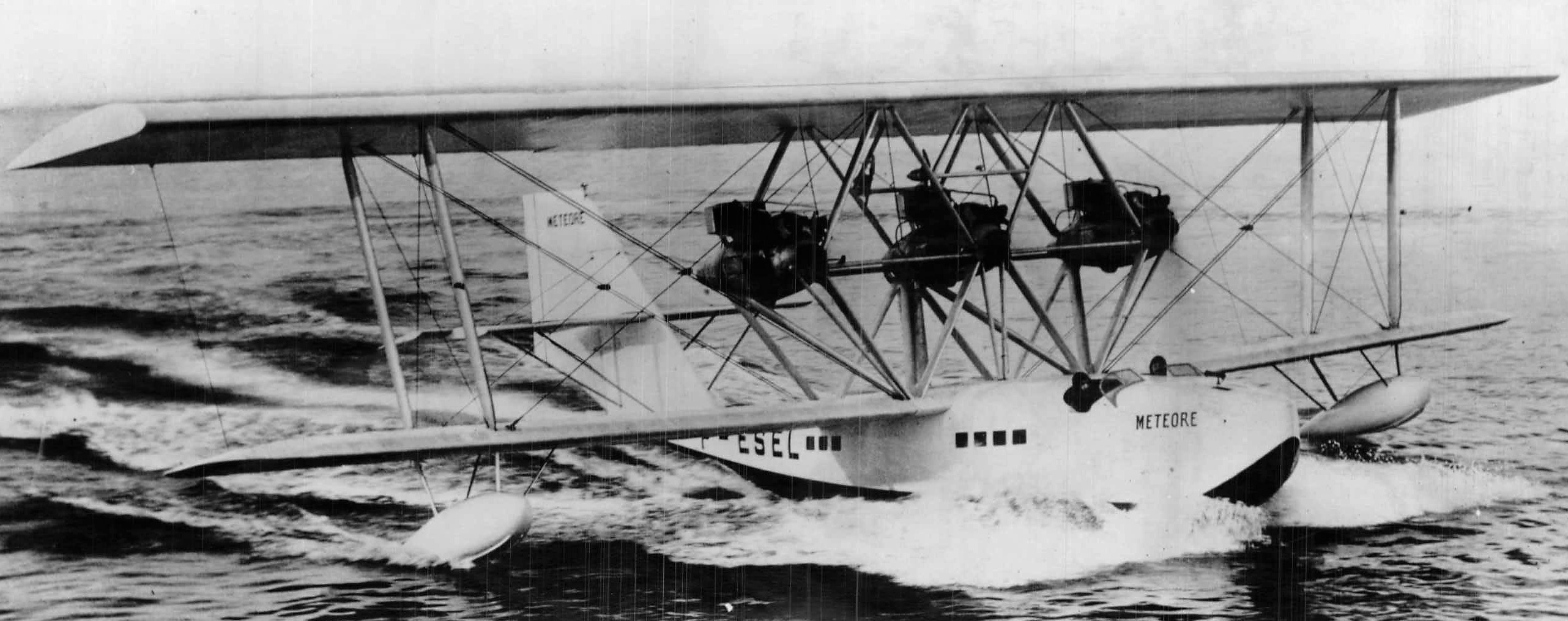

General information
- Type: Airliner
- National origin: France
- Manufacturer: SPCA
- Primary user: Air Union Lignes d'Orient
- Number built: 3

History
- First flight: 3 September 1925

The SPCA Météore 63 (French for "Meteor") was a biplane flying boat airliner designed and built by the French aircraft manufacturer Société Provençale de Constructions Aéronautiques (SPCA). It was the company's first aircraft, as well as the first seaplane to fulfil the strenuous conditions to secure a seaworthiness certificate of the first class and the first long distance seaplane to be procured by the French government.

The Météore 63 was developed during the mid 1920s, it conducted its maiden flight on 3 September 1925. In the following year, the flying boat was awarded first prize after passing every single test during a high-profile commercial seaplane contest.

== Development ==
The Météore 63 can trace its origins to the work of one man, Laurent-Dominique Santoni, who founded the Société Provençale de Constructions Aéronautiques (SPCA) after his departure from Chantiers Aéro-Maritimes de la Seine (CAMS) in 1925. The new company quickly set about developing its first aircraft, which it decided should be a flying boat airliner. It was specifically designed to comply with external specifications for commercial seaplanes at that time; the design would fulfil these to the extent that it became the first flying boat to meet the conditions for a seaworthiness certificate of the first class.

On 3 September 1925, the flying boat conducted its maiden flight. Early flights quickly proved the aircraft's flying characteristics to be relatively consistent, capable of performing rapid climbs and quick take-offs with a relatively low landing speed, and favourable maneuverability on the water and in the air. During 1926, the Météore 63 participated in that year's commercial seaplane contest, organised by France's Department of Aeronautics and the Aero Club of France. Its performance was quite positive, passing every single test conducted without any failures or need for repairs, leading to it being awarded first prize. During 1927, it carried out a series of operational-standard test flights on the non-stop Marseille to Algiers route; its manufacturers being keen to see the type establish a regular service between France and North Africa.

== Design ==
The Météore 63 was a biplane flying boat that had a relatively conventional configuration for the era, consisting of a single hull along with single-bay wings of unequal span. The majority of the structure was composed of timber except for the struts used to carry the flying boat's three engines, which were made of steel tubing instead. The hull, which had only a single step and was relatively sturdy, was deemed to be suitable for alighting on the open ocean, bolstering the flying boat's safety during lengthy water crossings. The exterior of the hull had three coverings that were made of teak, cedar, and plywood.

The hull was divided into a series of watertight compartments, two of which may be fitted out for the carriage of passengers, light freight, packages and air mail. The aircraft had an open flight deck that had two seats in a side-by-side arrangement for the pilot and either a navigator or a flight engineer. There was a door that permitted movement between the flight deck and the passenger cabin, which was fully enclosed within the hull. A separate door led between the passenger cabin and the baggage compartment. The cabin, which was both heated and lit electrically, could accommodate a maximum of six seated passengers. Furthermore, portholes were provided for external visibility and illumination of the cabin by day. The seats were relatively comfortable and were designed to receive shoulder-type parachutes. Various amenities and apparatus were onboard, it was equipped with an electric generator, a pair of alternators, fire extinguishers, dual flight controls, and radio equipment that could be used both during flight and while on the water.

The wings of the flying boat were non-staggered and had a relatively wide spacing between them. Both were braced with both struts and wires. The upper wing was of medium thickness and had a pair of balanced ailerons fitted upon them. The upper and lower wings differed considerably from one another. The lower wing was mounted to the top of the flying boat's hull and had trusswork above it that carried the aircraft's three engines mounted in a tractor configuration in the interplane gap. This trusswork also connected the lower wing to the centre of the upper wing. It also had a slight dihedral while the wing tips were both tapered and rounded. The lower wing also carried streamlined outrigger pontoons near its tips. The wings were covered in fabric.

It was powered by a total of three Hispano-Suiza 8Ac engines, each capable of producing up to 180 HP. One advantageous practice permitted by the aircraft's design was the ability to maintain level flight with a singe engine out; this permitted a flight to continue through to its destination in the event of such an engine failure. Furthermore, the mounting of the engines, in a transversal arrangement between the wings, meant that virtually all vibrations they produced during normal operations were eliminated. Typically, the flying boat carried sufficient fuel to permit a flight time of seven hours with the engines held at a constant cruising speed. Each engine drove a wooden twin-bladed tractor propeller. The nacelles were supported by a series of triangular struts. Positioned just aft and above each nacelle was a series of frontal radiators that were used to cool the engines.

The empennage was of a conventional design; it had a relatively large fin that was continuous with the hull, the rectangular stabilizer was positioned part-way up the fin. The lower side of the stabilizer was braced against the hull by a pair of small oblique struts while the upper side had two cables that attached it to the fin. Both the rudder and the two-part elevator were balanced.

== Operational history ==
During 1926, SPCA entered a Météore in a competition for transport seaplanes organised by the French Undersecretariat for Aeronautics, the Grand Prix des Hydravions de Transport Multimoteurs (Grand Prize of multi-engine transport seaplanes). Piloted by Ernest Burri, the Météore won first place and a FF 100,000 prize. It was also the first French transport seaplane to which Bureau Veritas awarded a first-class airworthiness certificate. The same year, Lignes Aériennes Latécoère trialled the type on a mail route between Marsailles and Algiers, the first trip taking place on 22 October.

Because of the Météore's long range, Air Union Lignes d'Orient (AULO) ordered an example in January 1927. In October that year, Maurice Noguès flew it from Marsailles to Beirut but crashed and sank off Naples during the return journey. Nevertheless, AULO purchased a second example in May 1928, and with this aircraft inaugurated a regular service between the two cities on 6 June 1929. On 17 February 1931, the Météore also established the Paris–Saigon route for Air Orient, which had been formed by a merger of AULO and Air Asie the previous year. Over its lifespan, the Météore covered 100,000 km (62,000 mi).

== Operators ==
- Lignes Aériennes Latécoère
- Air Union Lignes d'Orient

== Specifications ==
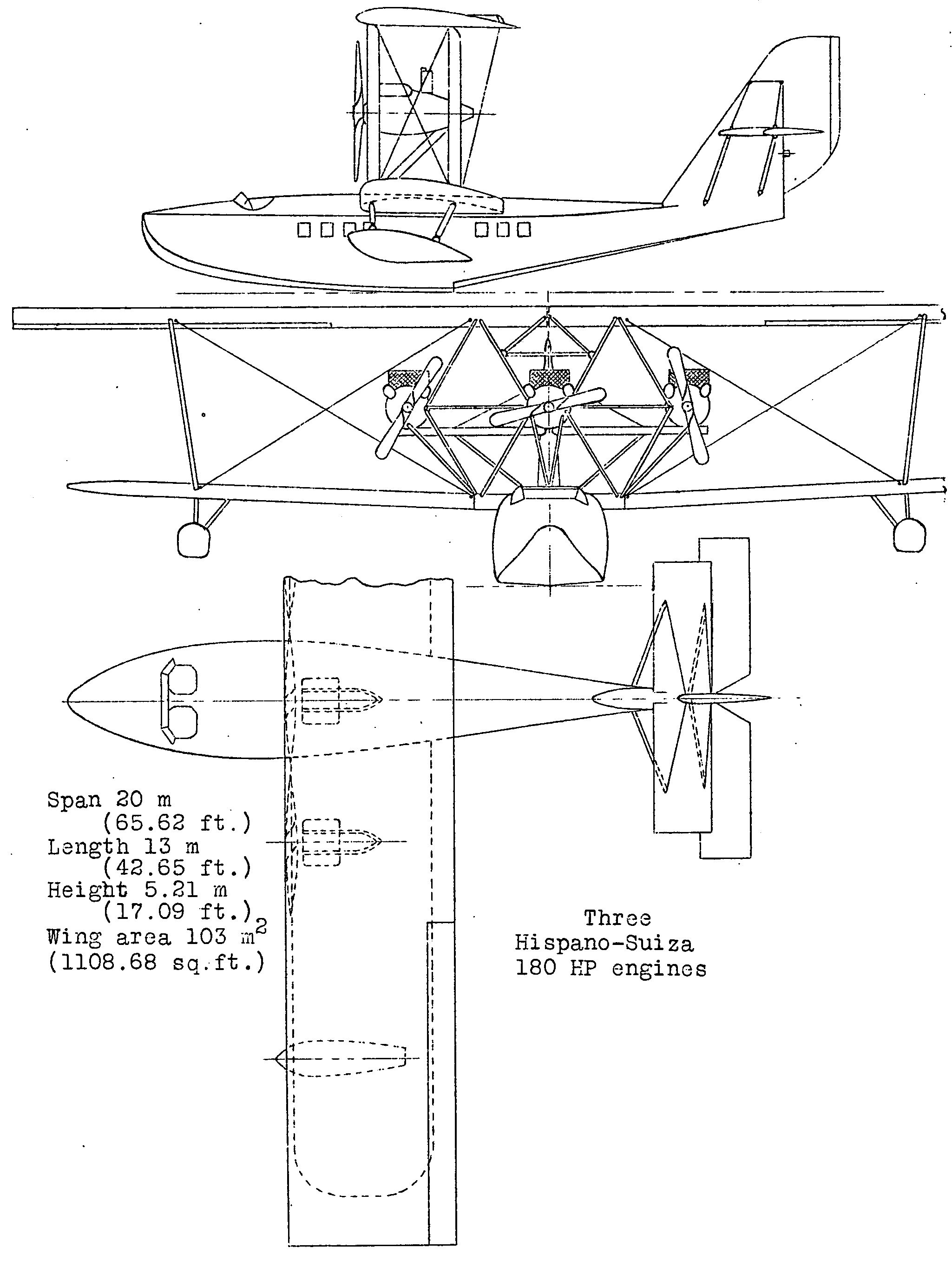
SPCA 63 3-view drawing from NACA Aircraft Circular No.41

Data from S.P.C.A. 'Météore' 63, National Advisory Committee for Aeronautics

General characteristics

- Capacity: six passengers
- Length: 13.05 m (42 ft 10 in)
- Wingspan: 21.20 m (69 ft 4 in)
- Height: 5.21 m (17 ft 1 in)
- Wing area: 103.0 m^{2} (1,108 sq ft)
- Empty weight: 3,400 kg (7,480 lb)
- Gross weight: 5,200 kg (9,240 lb)
- Powerplant: 3 × Hispano-Suiza 8Ac , 130 kW (180 hp) each

Performance

- Maximum speed: 167 km/h (104 mph, 90 kn)
- Range: 970 km (606 mi, 527 nmi)
- Service ceiling: 4,500 m (14,800 ft)

== See also ==
Related lists

- List of flying boats and floatplanes
