= Olive Ireland Hodges =

American missionary teacher in Japan

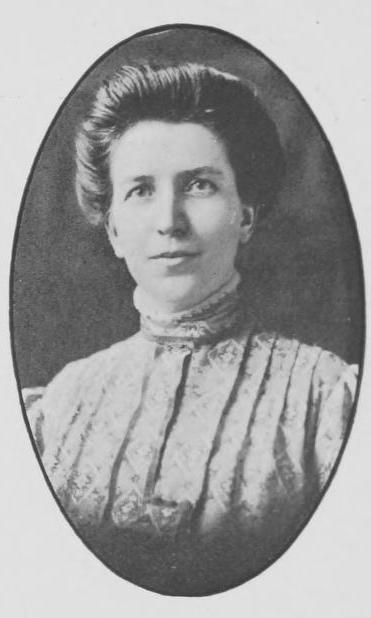
- Olive Ireland Hodges in 1910
- Born: January 21, 1877; West Virginia, United States
- Died: January 25, 1964 (aged 87); Chigasaki, Kanagawa Prefecture, Japan
- Occupation: Missionary educator

Olive Ireland Hodges (Japanese: オリヴ・ハジス, romanized: Orivu Hajisu; January 21, 1877 – January 25, 1964) was an American Methodist missionary teacher in Japan. From 1904 to 1938, she was principal of the Yokohama Eiwa Girls' School.

== Early life and education ==
Hodges was born in Buckhannon, West Virginia, the daughter of James Fife Hodges and Eliza Cummings Ireland Hodges. Her father taught school and was a farmer and stock dealer. She earned a teaching certificate from Huntington State Teachers' School in 1893, and attended Peabody Normal College in Tennessee. She completed a bachelor's degree at West Virginia University during a furlough from 1908 to 1910. She also studied at Garrett Bible Institute, and in 1931 was a member of the International Institute of Teachers College, Columbia University.

== Career ==
Hodges briefly taught mathematics in Morgantown, West Virginia as a young woman. In 1902, she became a missionary teacher in Japan. After training and language classes, she was director of the Shinsei Kataban Kindergarten in Nagoya for her first year, then from 1904 to 1938, she was principal of the Yokohama Eiwa Girls' School. She attended the 1910 World Missionary Conference in Edinburgh, and toured in Greece, Turkey, Syria and Egypt with a group of other conference attendees. She oversaw the school's expansion into newer buildings and broader programming, as well as its recovery from the Great Kantō Earthquake in 1923. She spoke to church groups while she was in the United States for furlough in 1932 and 1933, and in 1939.

During World War II, she was detained for a year as an enemy alien, then returned to the United States on the M.S. Gripsholm. She worked with Japanese Americans in the years after the war, helping them find housing and employment in Washington, D.C. after their own wartime incarceration. She returned to Japan in 1950, for an anniversary event at her old school. She stayed in Japan, living in Chigasaki, Kanagawa. She spoke to a women's church group in Idaho in 1954.

In 1940, Hodges received a medal from Emperor Hirohito, in recognition of her years of service.

== Personal life ==
Hodges's niece, Helen Virginia Barns, was also a missionary teacher in Japan. Hodges died from a heart attack in 1964, at the age of 87, in Chigasaki.
