= SPCA 10 =

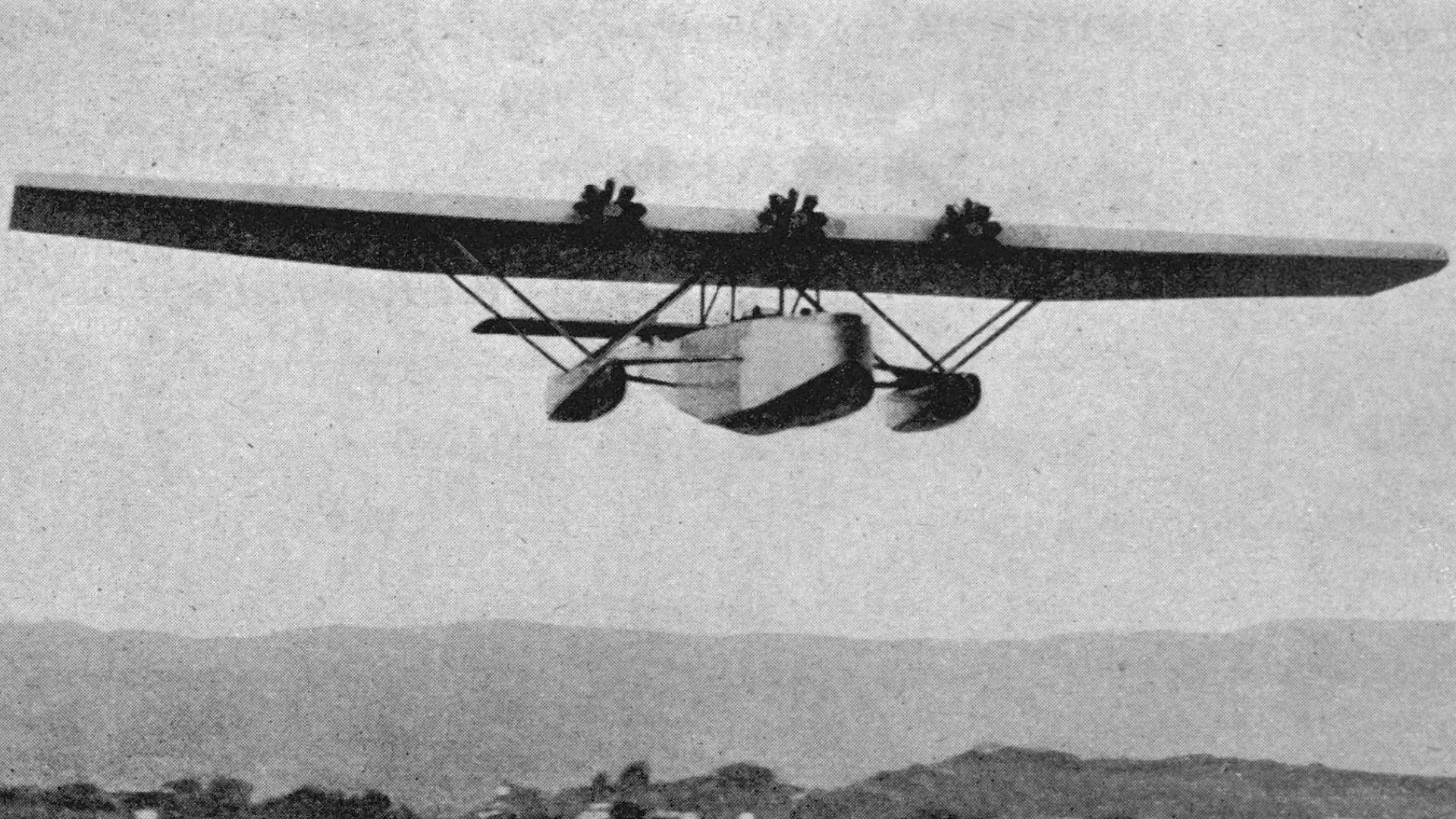
- SPCA Paulhan-Pillard

General information
- Type: Reconnaissance and bomber flying boat
- National origin: France
- Manufacturer: Société Provençale de Constructions Aéronautiques (SPCA)
- Designer: Louis Paulhan and Pillard
- Number built: 1

History
- First flight: 4 April 1928

The SPCA 10 or SPCA Paulhan-Pillard E.5 was a large, all-metal, French reconnaissance and bomber flying boat flown in 1928. Only one was built, and it was lost in a fatal crash during development.

== Design and development ==
The SPCA 10 was a parasol wing three-engined flying boat of all-metal construction. Its one-piece wing had a rectangular central region and trapezoidal outer areas, the latter carrying narrow ailerons over the whole of their trailing edges. The primary wing structure had a pair of steel spars and duralumin ribs. Unlike the rest of the aircraft, the wing was fabric covered. It was braced to the upper hull by a pair of parallel, vertical struts to each spar but stabilized with N-struts out to the floats, which were themselves braced to the outer wing spars with pairs of outward-leaning struts as well as by horizontal struts to the mid-hull. All these struts were steel tubes enclosed in streamlined casings.

The flying boat was powered by three 310 kW (420 hp) Gnome-Rhône 9Ac Jupiter nine-cylinder radials mounted, uncowled, on the wing leading edge as closely as the propeller discs allowed. Their fuel and oil tanks were in the wing, away from the engines to reduce fire risks. The wing was thick enough to allow the engineer in-flight access to most of the engine accessories.

The SPCA 10's hull was flat-sided and slender. Its single step planing bottom had a cross-section which altered from V in the nose to rounded at mid-hull. There was an open, circular position for a gunner or navigational observer in the extreme nose, with an enclosed navigator's cabin immediately aft. The pilots sat side by side in an open cockpit, equipped with dual control, midway between the nose and the leading edge. The central hull had internal compartments for the radio operator and the photographer and for rest. There were two, left-right staggered, open gunner's positions halfway between the trailing edge and the tail, which had openings in their floors above the waterline to allow downward fire or observation.

The SPCA 10 had a steel-framed, fabric covered fin with a swept leading edge and flat top. Its servo-balanced rudder was almost rectangular apart from a rounded heel at the base of the fuselage. The tailplane was mounted on the fin at about one third height and supported on each side by a splayed pair of struts from the hull. Both it and the elevators were rectangular in plan, apart from a cut-out between the latter in which the rudder worked.

== Operational history ==
The SCPA 10 first flew on 4 April 1928 at La Ciotat, piloted by Burri. After display at the July 1928 Paris Salon it went to Saint-Raphaël, Var, for official tests. These revealed a serious handling problem. When the engine speeds were reduced, the CAMS entered a dive, behaviour ascribed to the closeness of the propellers to the wing leading edge. As a result, alightings had to be made, counter-intuitively, under full power. The tests continued, though on 18 December 1928 an order was issued to stop them and modify the engine installation. Regrettably, this order was slow to reach Saint-Raphaël and on 8 January the pilot of the CAMS 10 reduced power on approach. The aircraft dived into the sea, killing all aboard. No more were built.

== Specifications ==
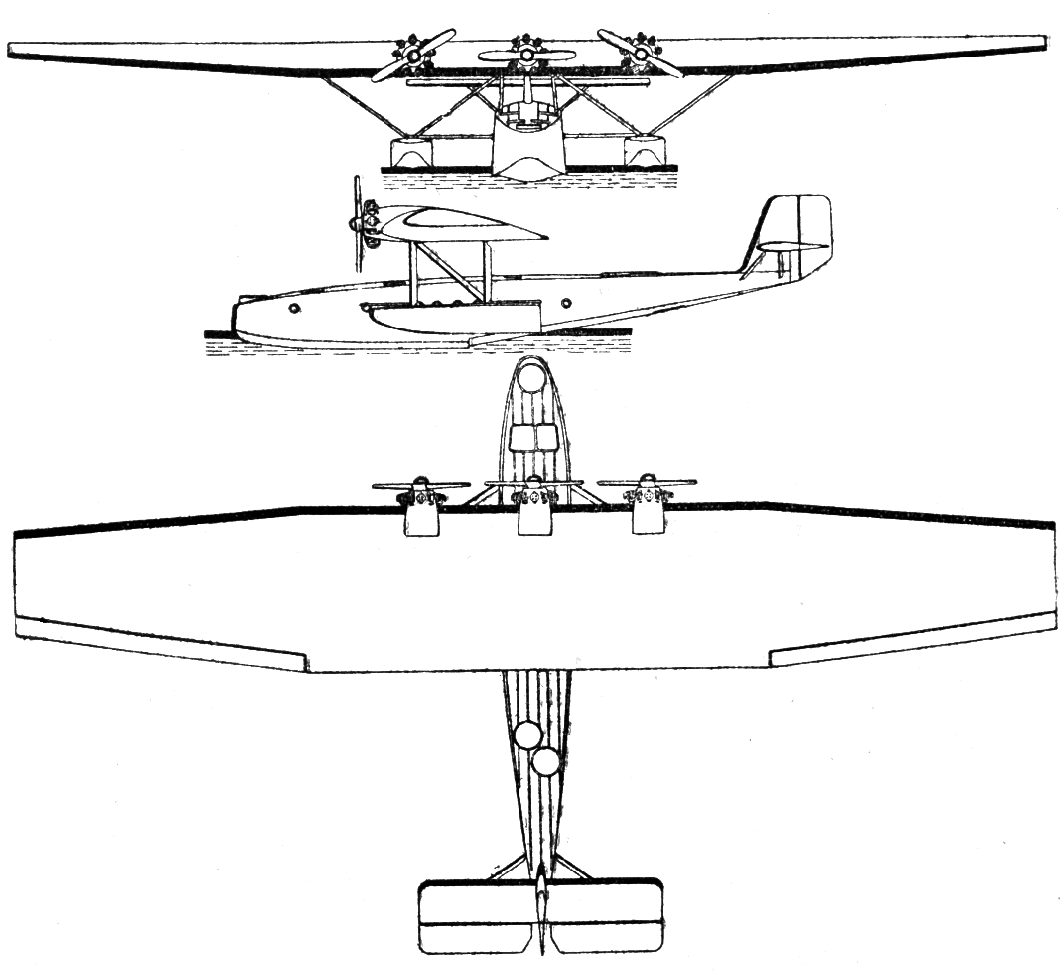
SPCA Paulhan-Pillard 3-view drawing from Les Ailes June 14,1928

Data from Les Ailes, June 1928, Aviafrance, Aeronautique Navale de chez nous, Jane's all the World's Aircraft 1928

General characteristics

- Crew: Five
- Length: 18.70 m (61 ft 4 in)
- Wingspan: 28.15 m (92 ft 4 in)
- Height: 4.50 m (14 ft 9 in)
- Wing area: 140 m^{2} (1,500 sq ft)
- Empty weight: 5,000 kg (11,023 lb)
- Gross weight: 8,200 kg (18,078 lb)
- Powerplant: 3 × Gnome-Rhône 9Ac Jupiter 9-cylinder direct-drive air-cooled radial piston engines, 310 kW (420 hp) each
- Propellers: 2-bladed fixed pitch propellers

Performance

- Maximum speed: 200 km/h (120 mph, 110 kn)
- Range: 1,500 km (930 mi, 810 nmi) with 1,000 kg (2,200 lb) payload
- Service ceiling: 5,000 m (16,000 ft)
- Time to altitude: 2,000 m (6,600 ft) in 13 minutes 17 seconds; 12,500 m (41,000 ft) in 16 minutes
- Wing loading: 60.7 kg/m^{2} (12.4 lb/sq ft)
- Power/mass: 0.110 kW/kg (0.067 hp/lb)

Armament

- Guns: Machine-gun positions in the nose and rear fuselage

== Bibliography ==
- Liron, Jean (June 1989). "Les SPCA: Le Météore 63 et Le SPCA I type 10". Le Fana de l'Aviation (in French). No. 235. pp. 19–28.
