= Georges Philippar (shipbuilder) =

Georges Philippar (16 October 1883 – 10 February 1959) was a French shipbuilder. He joined the Messageries Maritimes company in 1912, becoming its chief executive officer in 1925.

The ill-fated French ocean liner MS Georges Philippar was named after him. The ship caught fire on her maiden voyage in 1932 and sank in the Gulf of Aden with the loss of 54 lives.

== Biography ==
Georges Philippar was born in Fontenay-aux-Roses, he son of Edmond Anatole Philippar, director of the École nationale d'agriculture de Grignon. He married Marguerite Céline Jeanne Bonnet on 5 January 1907.

He founded the Société Provençale de Constructions Aéronautiques, an offshoot of SPCN (Société Provençale de Construction Navale), in 1925.

He died in Paris on 10 February 1959.

== See also ==
- Société Provençale de Constructions Aéronautiques
