= MS Georges Philippar =

French ocean liner (1930–1932)

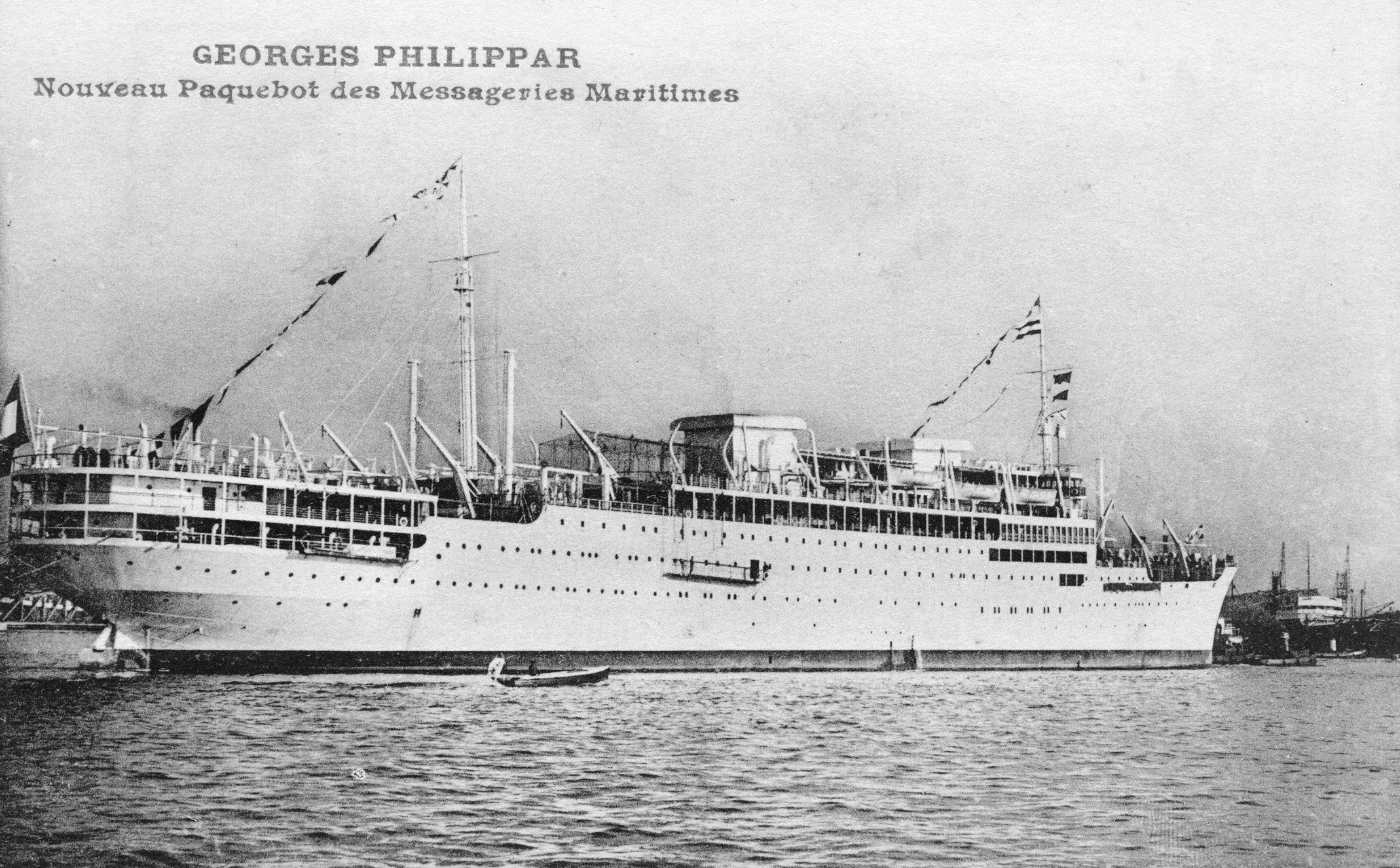

History

France
- Name: Georges Philippar
- Namesake: Georges Philippar
- Owner: Cie des Messageries Maritimes
- Port of registry: Marseilles
- Builder: Soc des Ateliers et Chantiers de la Loire, St Nazaire
- Launched: 6 November 1930
- Completed: January 1932
- Identification: Code letters ORVA
- Fate: Sank 15 May 1932

General characteristics
- Tonnage: 17,359 GRT; Tonnage under deck 13,162; 9,511 NRT
- Length: 542.7 ft (165.4 m)
- Beam: 68.2 ft (20.8 m)
- Depth: 46.9 ft (14.3 m)
- Installed power: 3,300 NHP
- Propulsion: 2× 10-cylinder 2S SC SA marine diesel engines; twin screws
- Speed: 18 1/2 knots (34.3 km/h)
- Capacity: 518 passengers
- Crew: 347

Georges Philippar was an ocean liner of the French Messageries Maritimes line that was built in 1930. On her maiden voyage in 1932 she caught fire and sank in the Gulf of Aden with the loss of 520 lives.

== Description ==
Georges Philippar was a 17,359 GRT ocean liner. She was 542.7 ft (165.4 m) long, with a beam of 68.2 ft (20.8 m) and a depth of 46.9 ft (14.3 m). She was a motor ship with two two-stroke, single cycle single-acting marine diesel engines. Each engine had 10 cylinders of 28 3/4 inches (730 mm) bore by 17 1/4 inches (440 mm) stroke and was built by Sulzer Brothers, Winterthur, Switzerland. Between them the two engines developed 3,300 NHP, giving the ship a speed of 18 1/2 knots (34.3 km/h).

== History ==
Georges Philippar was built by Ateliers et Chantiers de la Loire, Saint-Nazaire for Compagnie des Messageries Maritimes to replace Paul Lacat, which had been destroyed by fire in December 1928. She was launched on 6 November 1930. On 1 December 1930 she caught fire while being fitted out. Named after French Messageries Maritimes CEO Georges Philippar, she was completed in January 1932. She was registered in Marseilles.

Before she started her maiden voyage, French police warned her owners that threats had been made on 26 February 1932 to destroy the ship. The outward voyage took Georges Philippar to Yokohama, Japan, without incident and she started her homeward voyage, calling at Shanghai, China and Colombo, Ceylon. Georges Philippar left Columbo with 347 crew and 518 passengers aboard. On two occasions a fire alarm went off in a storeroom where bullion was being stored, but no fire was found. The Georges Philippar class was an innovative design, experimenting with Diesel propulsion, sporting unusual square section short smokestacks (whimsically dubbed flower pots by the sailors) and an extensive use of electricity, for lighting, kitchen and deck winches. CEO Georges Philippar, created a special Greek-Latin term "Nautonaphtes" (Oil-powered ships) for advertising purposes as he felt that Diesel sounded too Germanic for post-World War I French public.

At the time French sailor's lore considered giving a ship the name of a living person a way to attract bad luck and the practice was later discontinued. The electric plant and wiring of the Georges Philippar relied on high voltage (220 volts) Direct current. It proved troublesome from the shipyard stage onwards with cables overheating, circuit breakers malfunctioning … and so on. It was lavishly decorated with wood panelling and sported a high gloss varnished wooden grand staircase which proved highly flammable.

Position where Georges Phillipar sank, shown in relation to present-day Yemen.

=== Fire and loss ===
On 16 May, while Georges Philippar was 145 nautical miles (269 km) off Cape Guardafui, Italian Somaliland, a fire broke out in one of her luxury cabins occupied by Mme Valentin, when a spark from a faulty light switch ignited wood paneling. There was a delay in reporting the fire, which had spread by the time Captain Vicq was made aware of it. Vicq tried different firefighting methods, but to no avail. It has been reported that he decided to beach Georges Philippar on the coast of Aden and increased her speed, which only made the fire burn more fiercely. However, these reports are unsubstantiated as the engine rooms were evacuated and the ship was left drifting. The order to abandon ship was given and a distress signal sent.

Three ships came in response. The Soviet tanker Sovietskaïa Neft rescued 420 people, who were transferred to the French passenger ship Andre Lebon and landed at Djibouti. They returned to France on the French passenger ship Général Voyron. Another 149 people were rescued by Brocklebank Line's cargo ship Mahsud, and 129 more were rescued by T&J Harrison's cargo ship Contractor; Hakone Maru also participated. The two British ships landed their survivors at Aden. Mahsud also took the corpses of some of the 52 dead. On 19 May, Georges Philippar sank in the Gulf of Aden. Her position was 14°20′N 50°25′E.

Albert Londres, a French journalist, was last seen trying to escape by a porthole from the cabin in which he was trapped. Maurice Sadorge, the second engineering officer, tried to send him the end of a firehose from the deck above, but Londres couldn't grip it strongly enough and either fell in the sea or back into the burning cabin. His body was neither recovered nor identified. Some conspiracy theories, involving either sabotage by Ho Chi Minh or a covert assassination of Londres by the Japanese intelligence services, have been advanced but are deemed dubious.

The November 1932 edition of La Science et la Vie carried an artist's impression of the burning ship on its front cover.

== Court inquiry ==
An official enquiry was held and Cdt Vicq, his officers and crew, along with some passengers appeared in court along with Colonel Pouderoux, chief Paris firefighter, acting as an expert. Shipyard personnel were dissuaded from appearing in court but later testified that the electric plant of the Georges Philippar had been troublesome from the start and that the shipyard board had planned to postpone the ship's commissioning in order to correct the defects but later changed their minds under the pressure of delay penalties. Cdt Vicq downplayed the electrical troubles and frequent short circuits, only admitting trouble with the electric kitchen ovens and appliances. (He had to have new heating elements hastily manufactured in Yokohama as the original ones kept burning out in succession, exhausting the ship's supply of spares.) He chose to point out the faultless work of the emergency electrical generators, which he said were crucial in the comparatively low death toll. Captain's Vicq statements were probably biased by company loyalty and insurance reasons, but the enquiry nevertheless concluded that the disaster was a "catastrophic fire initiated by a malfunction in the high voltage DC power grid of the ship" and recommended banning wooden fittings and panelling as much as possible in the design of future ships. The state-of-the-art Normandie was one of the first ships to benefit from these new guidelines, incorporating massively over-engineered firefighting equipment, a less troublesome alternating current powerplant and state-of-the-art circuit breakers.

Ironically, this did not prevent Normandie from burning in New York during World War II as an inexperienced crew of US Coast Guardsmen had taken over from the French crew and were not familiar with the equipment. Despite the new regulations, fire-related disasters continued to plague French ocean liners throughout the next decade, including SS Atlantique in 1933, SS Lafayette in 1938, SS Paris in 1939, and Normandie in 1942.
