= Aoyama Gakuin Yokohama Eiwa High School =

Coeducational senior high school in Minami-ku, Yokohama, Japan

Coordinates: 35.4270°N 139.6104°E

Aoyama Gakuin Yokohama Eiwa High School (青山学院横浜英和中学高等学校) is a coeducational senior high school in Maita-chō (蒔田町), Minami-ku, Yokohama, Japan.

Missionary Harriet G. Brittan established Yokohama Eiwa Girls' School in 1880, which moved to where it is now in 1916, during the principalship of American missionary Olive Ireland Hodges. In 1939 the name changed to Seibi Gakuen due to the political climate of the time. The former name was restored in 1996, then was modified to the current name after it began partnering with Aoyama Gakuin. It began admitting boys in 2018.
