= Messageries Maritimes =

French merchant shipping company

- House flag
- Industry: Shipping
- Founded: 1851
- Defunct: 1977
- Successor: Compagnie générale maritime

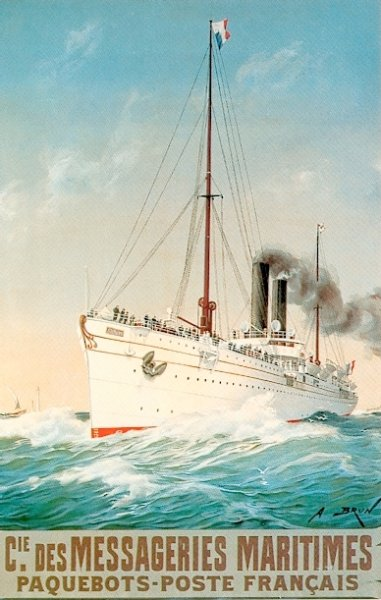
Poster Messageries Maritimes Alexandre Brun

Messageries Maritimes was a French merchant shipping company. It was originally created in 1851 as Messageries nationales, later called Messageries impériales, and from 1871, Compagnie des messageries maritimes, casually known as "MesMar" or by its initials "MM". Its rectangular house flag, with the letters MM on a white background and red corners, was famous in shipping circles, especially on the Europe-Asia trade lanes. In 1977 it merged with Compagnie générale transatlantique to form Compagnie générale maritime. In 1996 CGM was privatized and sold to Compagnie Maritime d'Affrètement (CMA) to form CMA CGM.

== Company history ==
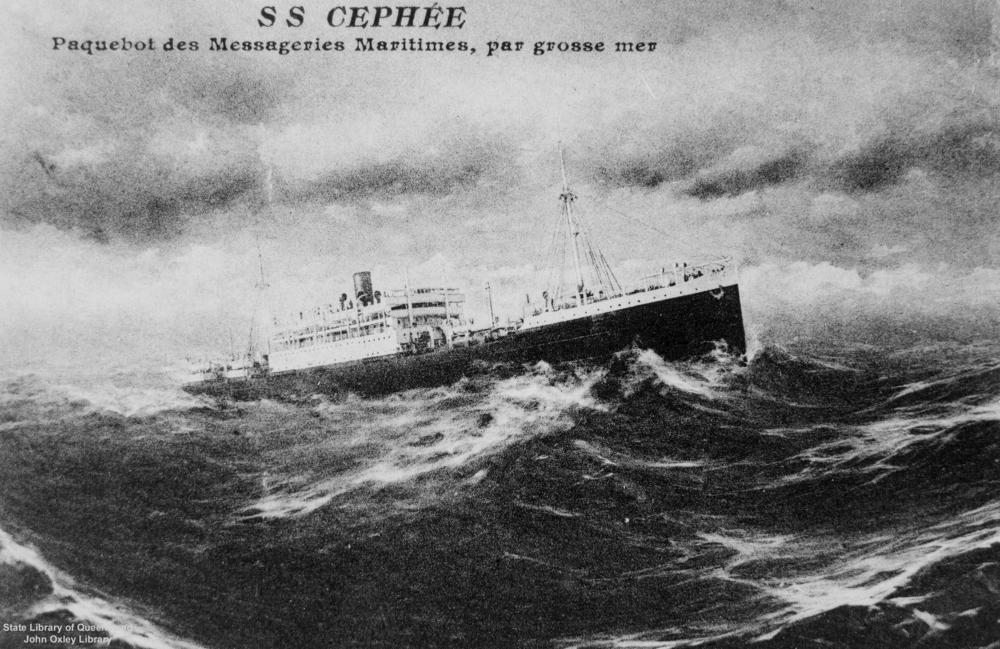
Hamburg Süd's 1912 liner Buenos Aires was transferred to MM as part of reparations after the First World War and renamed Cephée

=== Early history ===
In 1851 a ship owner from Marseille, Albert Rostand, proposed to Ernest Simons, director of a terrestrial carrier company, the Messageries nationales, to merge to create a shipping company, first called Messageries nationales, then Messageries impériales, and finally in 1871 the Compagnie des messageries maritimes. Two engineers, Henri Dupuy de Lôme and Armand Béhic joined the company, encouraging the purchase of the shipbuilding yards of La Ciotat in 1849.

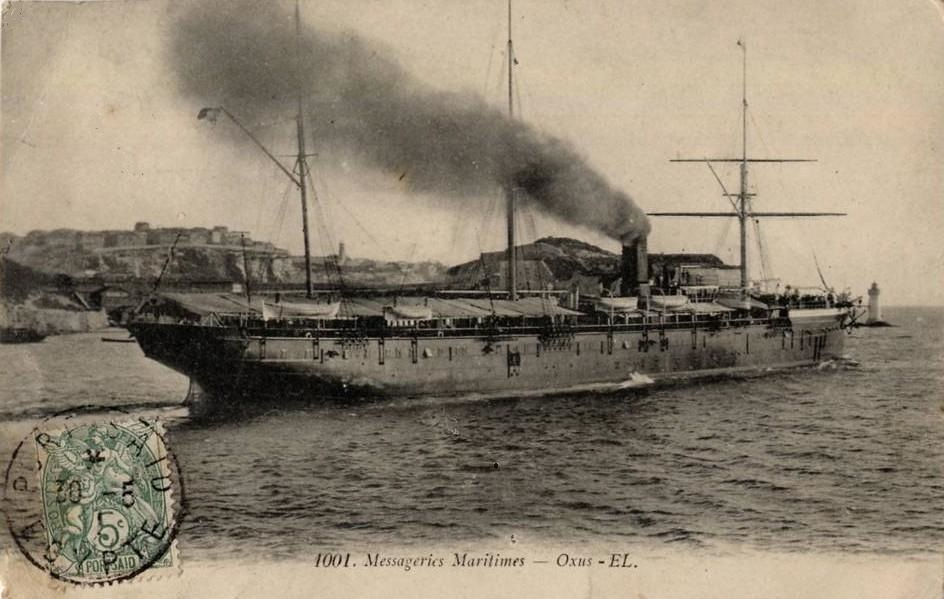
Messageries maritimes' 1879 sail- and steamship Oxus leaving port

In the beginning the Company operated on routes to the Middle East. Its ships were used as troopships during the Crimean War, and were so helpful for the army that the Emperor gave the company the right to operate on the Bordeaux – Brazil route as thanks. This was the first French transatlantic line equipped with steamers. The following year, the Société générale maritime (future Compagnie générale transatlantique) received the North Atlantic lines.

=== Golden Age ===
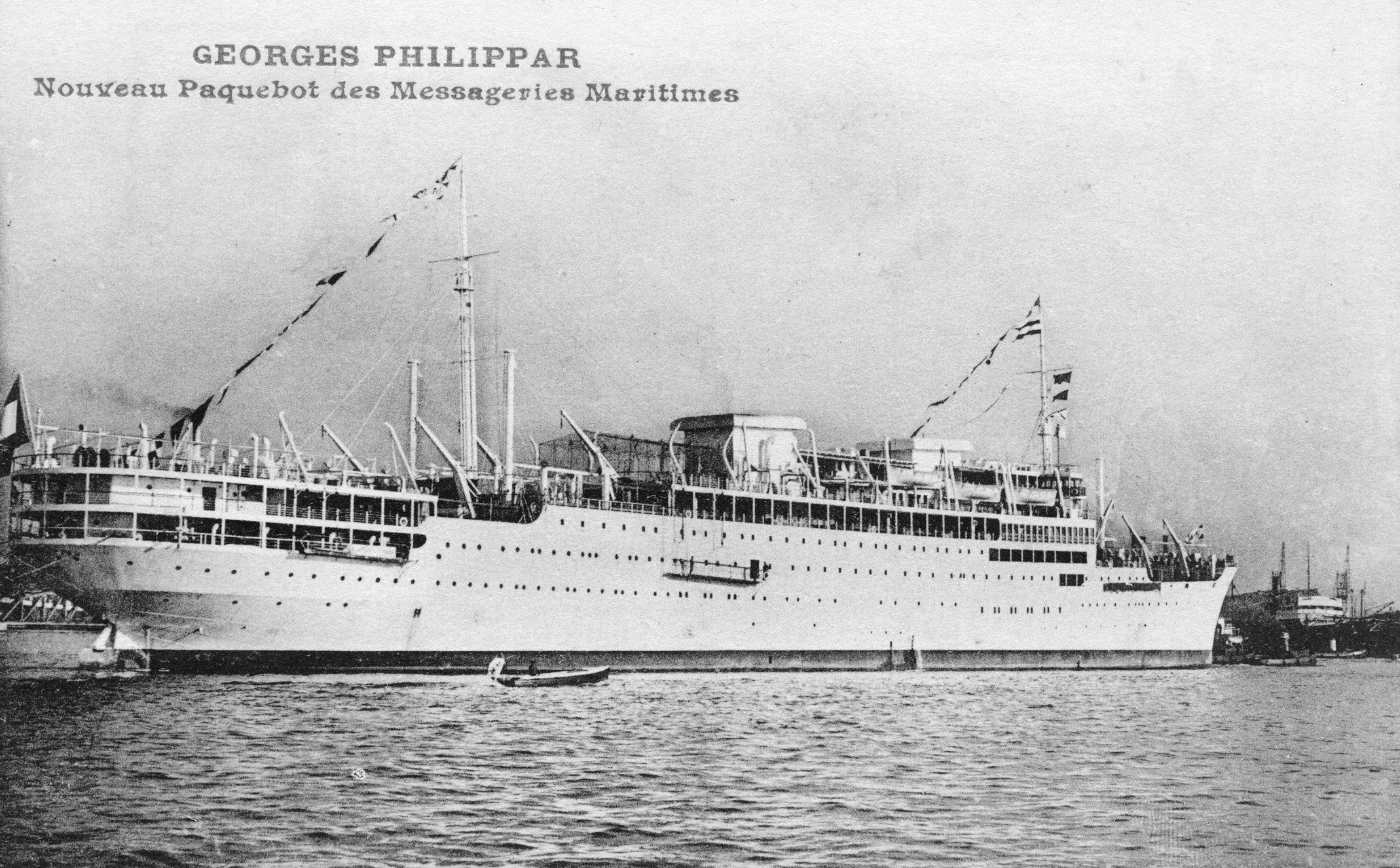
The 1930 ocean liner Georges Philippar was destroyed by fire in 1932

From 1871 to 1914 the company saw its golden age. This was the period of French colonial expansion and of interventionism in the Middle and Far East. The Marseille liners continuously served in the Mediterranean Sea, the Black Sea, then the Red Sea, the Indian Ocean, the China Sea and finally the Pacific Ocean. In the west, the South Atlantic line filled out. Ships of this line were some of the first large vessels to be fitted with the new water-tube boilers, specifically the large-tube Belleville boiler. Their performance was of such interest to the British Royal Navy that the Jerseyman Edouard Gaudin, who could pass for French, was sent to investigate their use. His report was an influence on their fitment to new ships, the Powerful-class cruisers HMS Powerful & Terrible. Even the North Atlantic knew the ships with the typical double funnel, which worked the route London – Dunkirk – Le Havre – Marseille. In the Middle East, the ports of call were Malta, Alexandria, Port Said, Beirut, Syria, Smyrna, Constantinople, and the Black Sea. In the Indian Ocean, the line served Mahé, Seychelles, La Réunion, Mauritius, Zanzibar and Madagascar as well as the French establishments in India. At Pondicherry the small harbour necessitated the use of ship's tenders.

In 1912, the company lost its exclusive right to carry French mail on South American routes to Compagnie de Navigation Sud-Atlantique.

==== First World War & Post war ====
During the First World War, the company lost a large part of its fleet, as did most of the shipping companies of the Entente powers. After the war, an extensive new building programme was started. The ships that were lost in the war were replaced by larger and more luxurious liners and the newly opened Panama Canal was added to the route network at the beginning of the 1920s. During this time, Georges Philippar was President of Messageries Maritimes. He was a great admirer of Alexandre Dumas and made sure that on every ship on the line there was something reminiscent of the writer; four ships were named after The Three Musketeers. In 1932, the Georges Philippar caught fire on her maiden voyage and sank in the Gulf of Aden with the loss of 54 lives. The ship was named after Georges Philippar, the CEO of the company.

=== Second World War ===
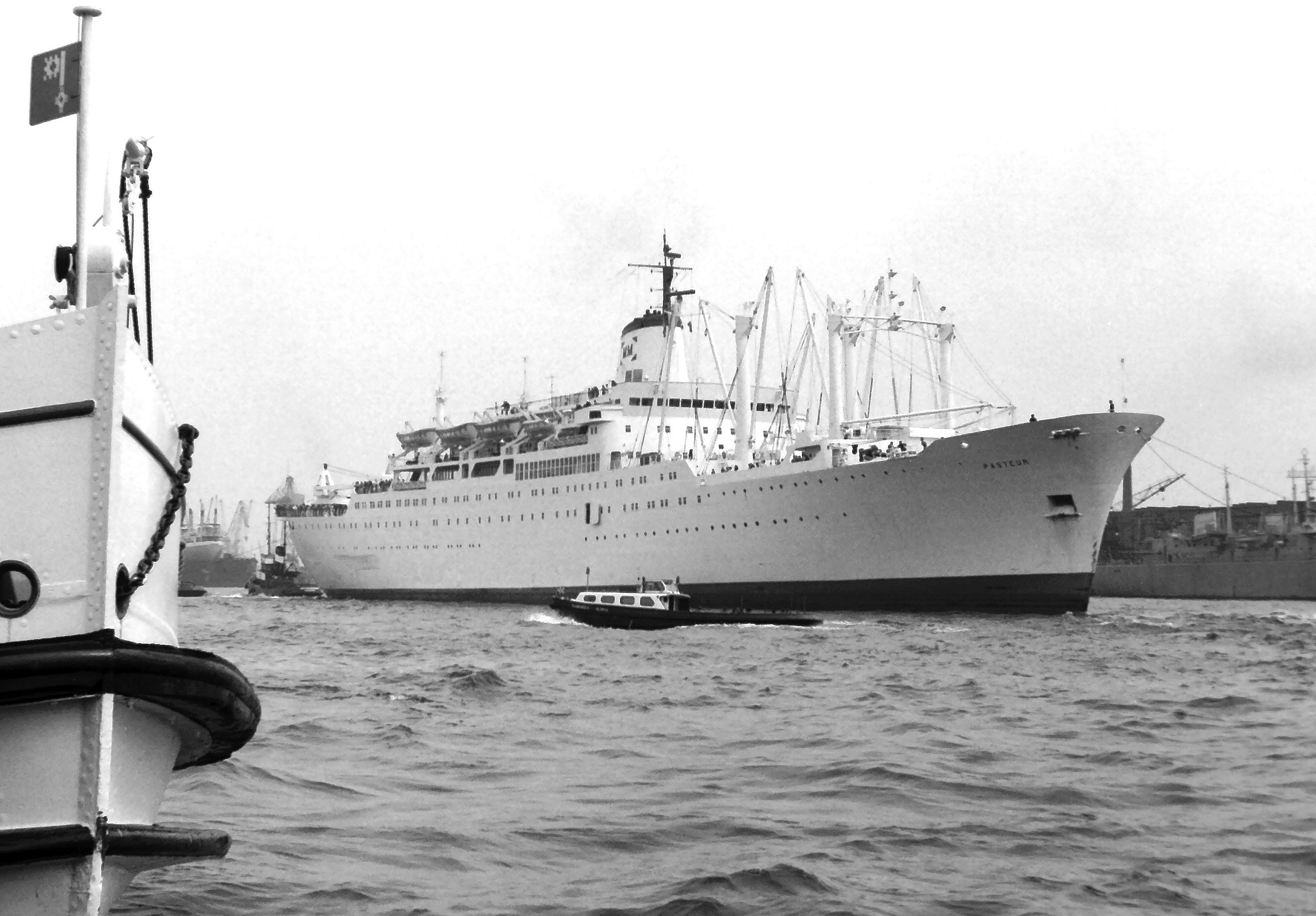
Pasteur was the last passenger ship of the company

During the Second World War, most of the company's fleet were laid up in port, but as the war continued most of the ships were sunk or commissioned into other services, split between the Allies and Vichy France. and by 1945 the decimated fleet had only 21 ships left.

=== Post war and Decline ===
The Far East was the private field of the company. Cambodge was the first of three new liners that modernised MM's Far East route in the 1950s. Saigon was rapidly becoming the second home port of the company. The "stationnaires", ships of small tonnage, afforded to the local lines departed from there. They went to Hanoi, Yokohama, Hong Kong, Shanghai, Australia and New Caledonia.

They had the largest fleet of ships under one flag, with nine combination passenger/cargo liners built in the 1950s for routes across Europe and Africa to areas containing commercial or cultural interests for France's citizens.

In the South Atlantic, the Brazil line went as far as Montevideo and Buenos Aires. Less important, and less known, its home port initially was Bordeaux, before it became Hamburg in its latter years. By the 1960s and 70s, as air travel became more popular, many companies' passenger services, like those of Messageries Maritimes, were brought to a halt, and the container found its way into the freight sector, which required a completely new type of ship with the container ship. In 1972 all liner services were discontinued and they were replaced by global container services. In 1977 the French Government proceeded with merging its two state-controlled shipping lines, i.e. Compagnie générale transatlantique and Messageries Maritimes, into a single one named Compagnie générale maritime.
