= List of ship launches in 1949 =

The list of ship launches in 1949 includes a chronological list of all ships launched in 1949.

Date	Ship	Class / type	Builder	Location	Country	Notes
27 January	Cazador	Tanker	Harland & Wolff	Belfast	United Kingdom	For Estrella Maritima SA.
15 February	Explorador	Tanker	Harland & Wolff	Belfast	United Kingdom	For Estrella Maritima SA.
17 February	Setter 4	Whaler	Harland & Wolff	Belfast	United Kingdom	For United Whalers Ltd.
28 February	Vila do Porto	Refrigerated cargo ship	Blyth Dry Docks & Shipbuilding Co. Ltd	Blyth, Northumberland	United Kingdom	For Compagnia de Navigacion Carregadores Acoreanos.
12 March	BO-198	Kronshtadt-class submarine chaser	Zelenodolsk Gorky Plant	Zelenedolsk	Soviet Union	
17 March	Vestfoss	Tanker	Harland & Wolff	Belfast	United Kingdom	For A/S Thor Thorsen.
21 March	BO-196	Kronshtadt-class submarine chaser	Zelenodolsk Gorky Plant	Zelenedolsk	Soviet Union	
29 March	Amarna	Cargo ship	Harland & Wolff	Belfast	United Kingdom	For Moss Hutchinson Line.
29 March	Champavati	Ferry	Harland & Wolff	Belfast	United Kingdom	For Bombay Steam Navigation Co.
29 March	Decoy	Daring-class destroyer	Yarrow Shipbuilders	Glasgow, Scotland	United Kingdom	
30 March	Rohidas	Ferry	Harland & Wolff	Belfast	United Kingdom	For Bombay Steam Navigation Co.
2 April	BO-199	Kronshtadt-class submarine chaser	Zelenodolsk Gorky Plant	Zelenedolsk	Soviet Union	
7 April	BO-200	Kronshtadt-class submarine chaser	Zelenodolsk Gorky Plant	Zelenedolsk	Soviet Union	
11 April	BO-201	Kronshtadt-class submarine chaser	Zelenodolsk Gorky Plant	Zelenedolsk	Soviet Union	
13 April	Helenus	Cargo ship	Harland & Wolff	Belfast	United Kingdom	For Blue Funnel Line.
19 April	BO-247	Kronshtadt-class submarine chaser	Zelenodolsk Gorky Plant	Zelenedolsk	Soviet Union	
28 April	Vilhelm Torkildsen	Cargo ship	Blyth Dry Docks & Shipbuilding Co. Ltd	Blyth, Northumberland	United Kingdom	For Skibs A/S Vilhelm Torkildsens Rederi.
24 May	Setter 5	Whaler	Harland & Wolff	Belfast	United Kingdom	For United Whalers Ltd.
31 May	Assiout	Cargo ship	Harland & Wolff	Belfast	United Kingdom	For Moss Hutchinson Line.
10 June	Vikingen	Tanker	Harland & Wolff	Belfast	United Kingdom	For Panama City Tanker Co.
19 June	BO-251	Kronshtadt-class submarine chaser	Zelenodolsk Gorky Plant	Zelenedolsk	Soviet Union	
22 June	BO-249	Kronshtadt-class submarine chaser	Zelenodolsk Gorky Plant	Zelenedolsk	Soviet Union	
28 June	Chusan	Himalaya-class ocean liner	Vickers-Armstrongs	Barrow-in-Furness, England	United Kingdom	For P&O
28 June	Setter 6	Whaler	Harland & Wolff	Belfast	United Kingdom	For United Whalers Ltd.
28 June	Cambodge	Ocean liner	Societe des Ateliers & Chantiers	Dunkirk	France	For Messageries Maritimes
June	D.E. 44	Barge	Alabama Drydock and Shipbuilding Company	Mobile, Alabama	United States	For Duval Engineering & Construction.
June	S-10	Barge	Alabama Drydock and Shipbuilding Company	Mobile, Alabama	United States	For Benton & Co. Inc.
June	No. 2	Barge	Alabama Drydock and Shipbuilding Company	Mobile, Alabama	United States	For Ideal Cement Co.
June	2 unnamed vessels	Barges	Alabama Drydock and Shipbuilding Company	Mobile, Alabama	United States	For private owners.
1 July	BO-250	Kronshtadt-class submarine chaser	Zelenodolsk Gorky Plant	Zelenedolsk	Soviet Union	
27 July	Hector	Cargo liner	Harland & Wolff	Belfast	United Kingdom	For Blue Funnel Line.
28 July	Ernst Larsen	Whaler	Harland & Wolff	Belfast	United Kingdom	For Union Whaling Co.
August	BO-248	Kronshtadt-class submarine chaser	Zelenodolsk Gorky Plant	Zelenedolsk	Soviet Union	
4 August	BO-252	Kronshtadt-class submarine chaser	Zelenodolsk Gorky Plant	Zelenedolsk	Soviet Union	
10 August	Daring	Daring-class destroyer	Swan Hunter	Wallsend, England	United Kingdom	
11 August	British Captain	Tanker	Harland & Wolff	Belfast	United Kingdom	For British Tanker Company.
16 August	Natalia	Whaler	Harland & Wolff	Belfast	United Kingdom	For Union Whaling Co. Completed as Arnt Karlsen.
24 August	Bloemfontein Castle	Passenger ship	Harland & Wolff	Belfast	United Kingdom	For Union-Castle Line.
28 August	BO-253	Kronshtadt-class submarine chaser	Zelenodolsk Gorky Plant	Zelenedolsk	Soviet Union	
29 August	Bloemfontein Castle	Ocean liner	Harland and Wolff	Belfast, Northern Ireland	United Kingdom	For Union-Castle Line
31 August	BO-254	Kronshtadt-class submarine chaser	Zelenodolsk Gorky Plant	Zelenedolsk	Soviet Union	
11 September	BO-255	Kronshtadt-class submarine chaser	Zelenodolsk Gorky Plant	Zelenedolsk	Soviet Union	
22 September	Ternoy	Tanker	Harland & Wolff	Belfast	United Kingdom	For A/S Truma.
23 September	Nelly Maersk	Tanker	Blyth Dry Docks & Shipbuilding Co. Ltd	Blyth, Northumberland	United Kingdom	For A/S D/S Svendborg and D/S af 1912 A/S.
24 September	Sea Hurricane	Aircraft transport ship	James Pollock & Sons	Faversham	United Kingdom	For Fleet Air Arm. Contract cancelled, completed as the coaster Goldlynx for E. J. & W. Goldsmith Ltd.
25 September	BO-271	Kronshtadt-class submarine chaser	Zelenodolsk Gorky Plant	Zelenedolsk	Soviet Union	
30 September	BO-272	Kronshtadt-class submarine chaser	Zelenodolsk Gorky Plant	Zelenedolsk	Soviet Union	
10 October	Africana 2	Research trawler	Harland & Wolff	Belfast	United Kingdom	For South African Government.
21 October	Runic	Refrigerated cargo ship	Harland & Wolff	Belfast	United Kingdom	For Shaw Savill Line.
23 October	Boleh	junk yacht	Robin Kilroy	Singapore	Singapore	
26 October	Kurdistan	Tanker	Harland & Wolff	Belfast	United Kingdom	For Commons Bros. Ltd.
1 November	BO-273	Kronshtadt-class submarine chaser	Zelenodolsk Gorky Plant	Zelenedolsk	Soviet Union	
21 November	British Commander	Tanker	Harland & Wolff	Belfast	United Kingdom	For British Tanker Company.
21 November	Fana	Cargo ship	Blyth Dry Docks & Shipbuilding Co. Ltd	Blyth, Northumberland	United Kingdom	For Skibs A/S Vilhelm Torkildsens Rederi.
26 November	Brook			Lübeck	Germany	For H. M. Gehrcken
21 November	Soya Christina	Tanker	Short Brothers Ltd.	Sunderland	United Kingdom	For O. Wallenius.
4 December	BO-274	Kronshtadt-class submarine chaser	Zelenodolsk Gorky Plant	Zelenedolsk	Soviet Union	
6 December	Baro	Cargo ship	Blyth Dry Docks & Shipbuilding Co. Ltd	Blyth, Northumberland	United Kingdom	For Elder Dempster Lines Ltd.
20 December	BO-275	Kronshtadt-class submarine chaser	Zelenodolsk Gorky Plant	Zelenedolsk	Soviet Union	
28 December	BO-276	Kronshtadt-class submarine chaser	Zelenodolsk Gorky Plant	Zelenedolsk	Soviet Union	
1st Quarter	Jorundur	Fishing trawler	Brooke Marine Ltd.	Lowestoft	United Kingdom	For Gudmundur Jorundsson.
Unknown date	B.H.C. Motor Ferry No. 5	Ferry	Blyth Dry Docks & Shipbuilding Co. Ltd	Blyth, Northumberland	United Kingdom	For Blyth Harbour Commissioners.
Unknown date	Changsha	Passenger ship	Scotts Shipbuilding and Engineering Co. Ltd.	Greenock	United Kingdom	For China Navigation Co. Ltd.
Unknown date	Field	Motor barge	J. Bolson & Son Ltd.	Poole	United Kingdom	For Hayes Wharfe.
Unknown date	Papoose	Towboat	Alabama Drydock and Shipbuilding Company	Mobile, Alabama	United States	For Warrior & Gulf Navigation.
Unknown date	Taiyuan	Passenger ship	Scotts Shipbuilding and Engineering Co. Ltd.	Greenock	United Kingdom	For China Navigation Co. Ltd.
