= ACDB =

ACDB may refer to:

- African Centre for DNA Barcoding
- Agriculture Cooperative and Development Bank
- Alternating current distribution board
- Ateliers et Chantiers de Dunkerque-Bordeaux
- Anime Characters Database
