= Adolphe (ship) =

Ship wrecked on Hunter River in New South Wales, Australia in 1904

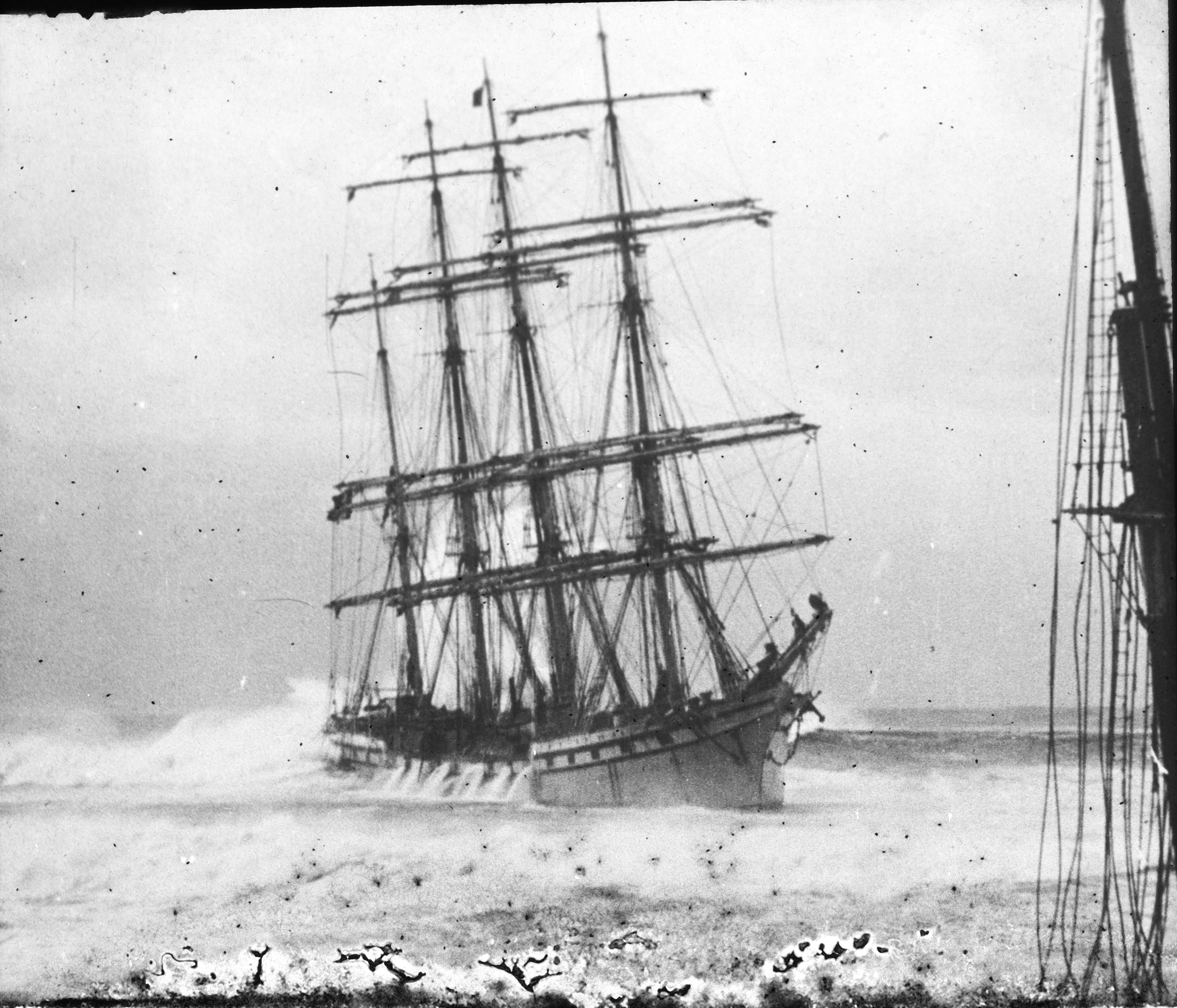
- The wreck of the Adolphe on 30 September 1904. The mast of the shipwreck Regent Murray is visible on the right.

History
- Name: Adolphe
- Owner: Ant. Dom. Bordes et fils
- Port of registry: Dunkirk, France
- Builder: A.-D. Bordes et Fils of Bordeaux
- Laid down: shipyard of Chantiers de France, Dunkerque
- Launched: 23 March 1902
- Completed: 1902
- Maiden voyage: September 1902 - Arrived at Iquique from Port Talbot after 105 days
- Fate: Wrecked

General characteristics
- Type: Barquentine
- Tonnage: 3,204 GRT
- Displacement: 2,413 NRT
- Length: 95.58 m (313.58 ft)
- Beam: 13.74 m (45.08 ft)
- Draught: 7.345 m (24.098 ft)
- Crew: 32

The Adolphe was a sailing ship that was wrecked at the mouth of the Hunter River in New South Wales, Australia, in 1904. The ship is now the most prominent of several wrecks on what is now the Stockton breakwall, which protects Newcastle harbour. The rescue of the ship's crew has gone down in local maritime history as one of the most remarkable in local waters.

== Ship description and construction ==
Adolphe was a four-masted steel barque built in 1902 by Chantiers de France, Dunkerque. It was rigged with double top and topgallant sails.

== Shipwreck event ==
On 30 September 1904, the Adolphe was being towed through the entrance of Newcastle harbour by the tugs Hero and Victoria after an 85-day voyage in ballast from Antwerp under the command of Captain Lucas. Heavy seas prevented the tugs from holding her, and after the tug hawser parted she was swept first on to the wreck of the Colonist, then battered by waves that forced her on top of other submerged wrecks on what was then called the Oyster Bank. The lifeboat hurried to the scene and within two hours all 32 of the crew had been taken off. The northern breakwater of the entrance to the port of Newcastle was extended after the loss of the Adolphe. The French consul made an official visit to Newcastle to recognise the efforts of the lifeboat crew.

When the breakwater was extended in 1906 and reached the remains of the Adolphe, her remaining two masts and jib-boom were removed for safety reasons. She is actually resting across the remains of SS Wendouree, wrecked in 1898, and SS Lindus, lost in 1899. The location of the wreck is approximately 32°54′49.46″S 151°47′50.21″E.

== Gallery ==
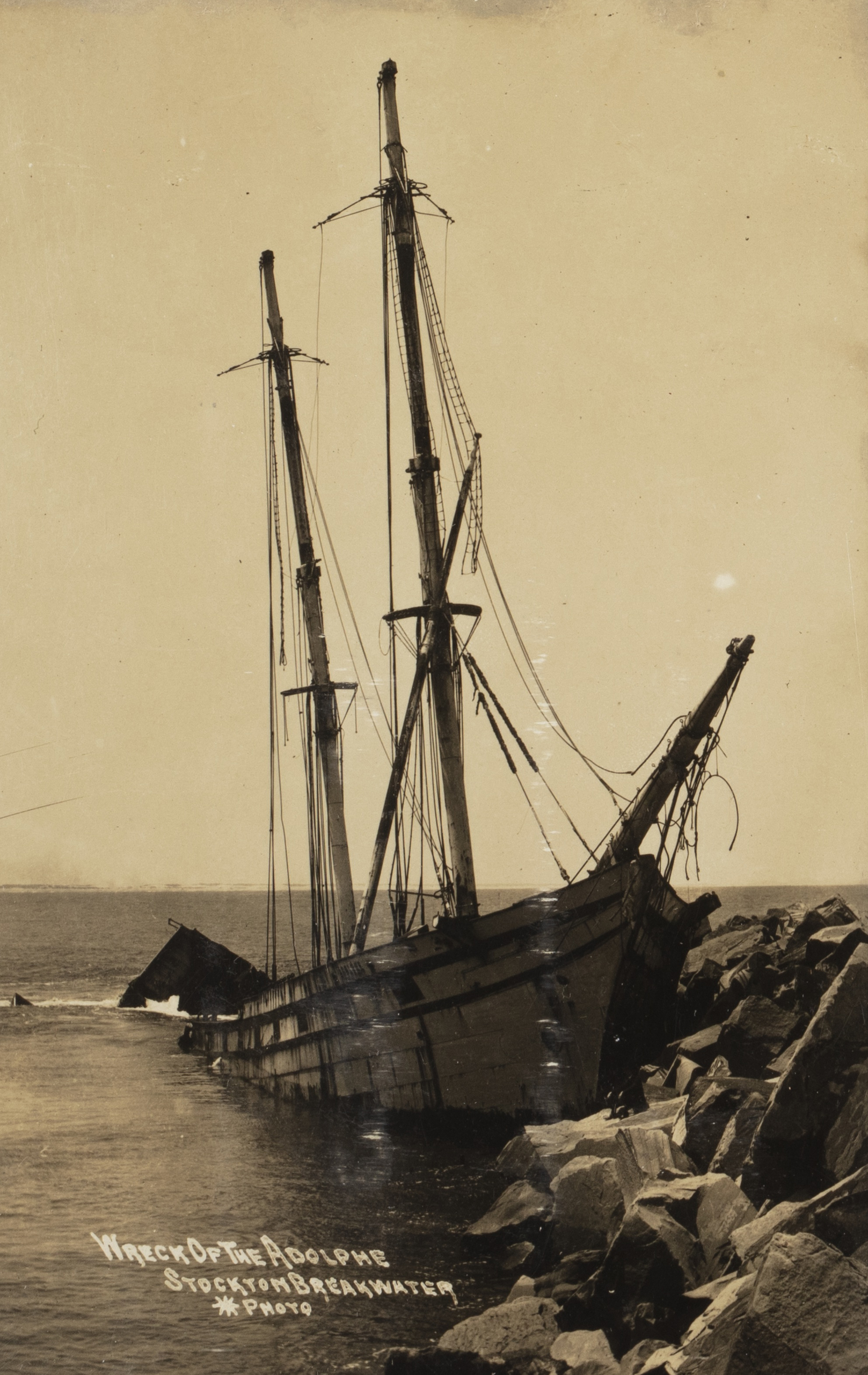
Adolphe sailing ship, Stockton Breakwater, Newcastle, c. 1904

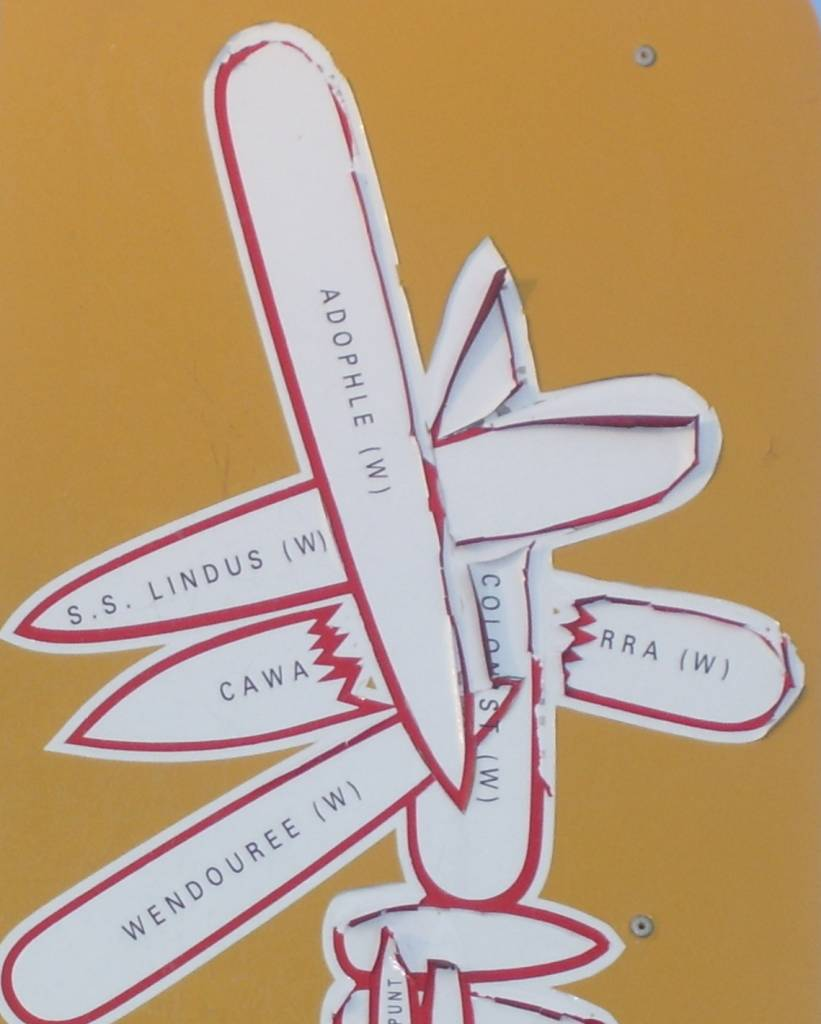
Location of Adolphe on Stockton breakwall in relation to other wrecks including that of SS Cawarra

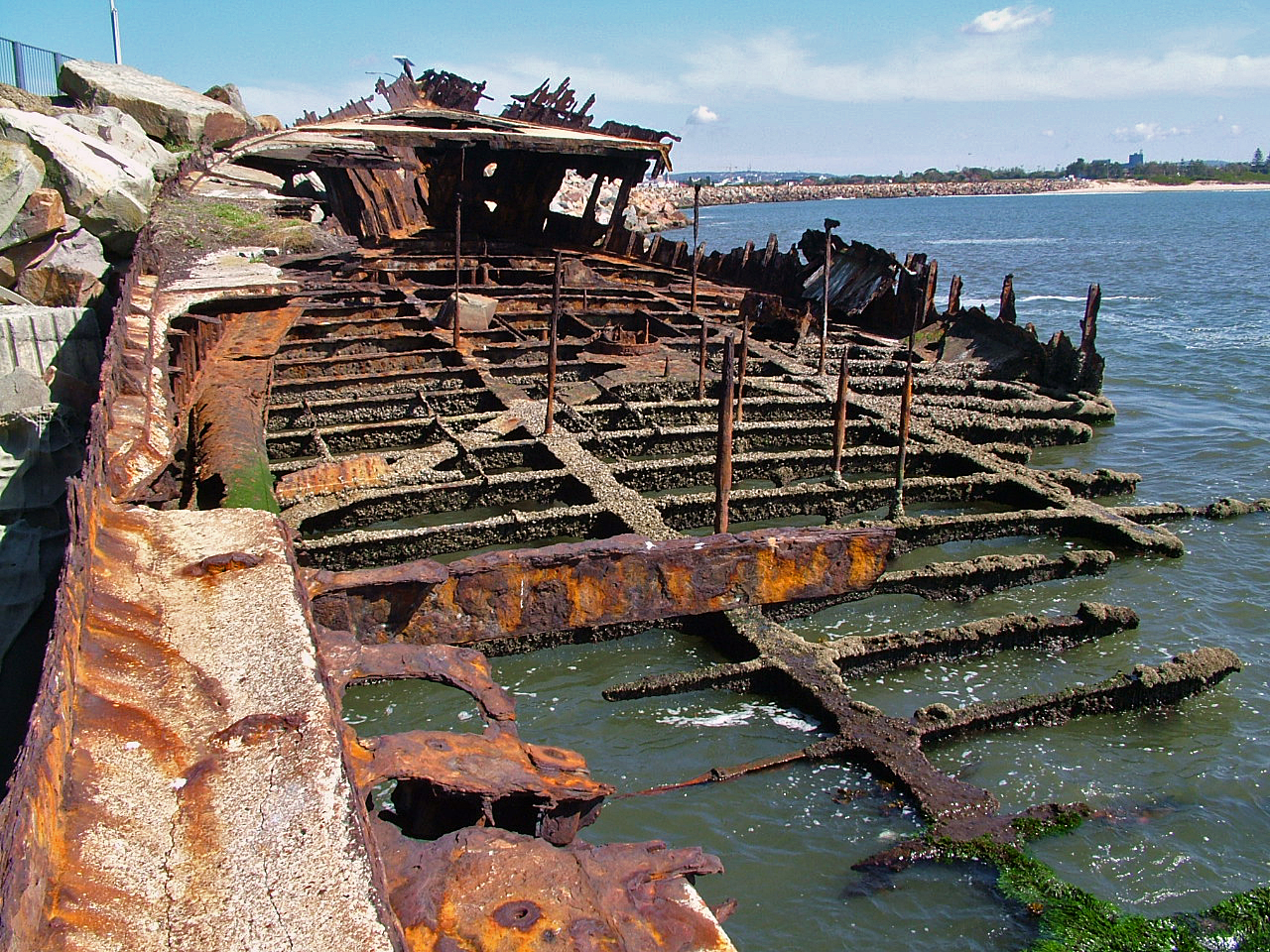
The wreck of the Adolphe on Stockton breakwall

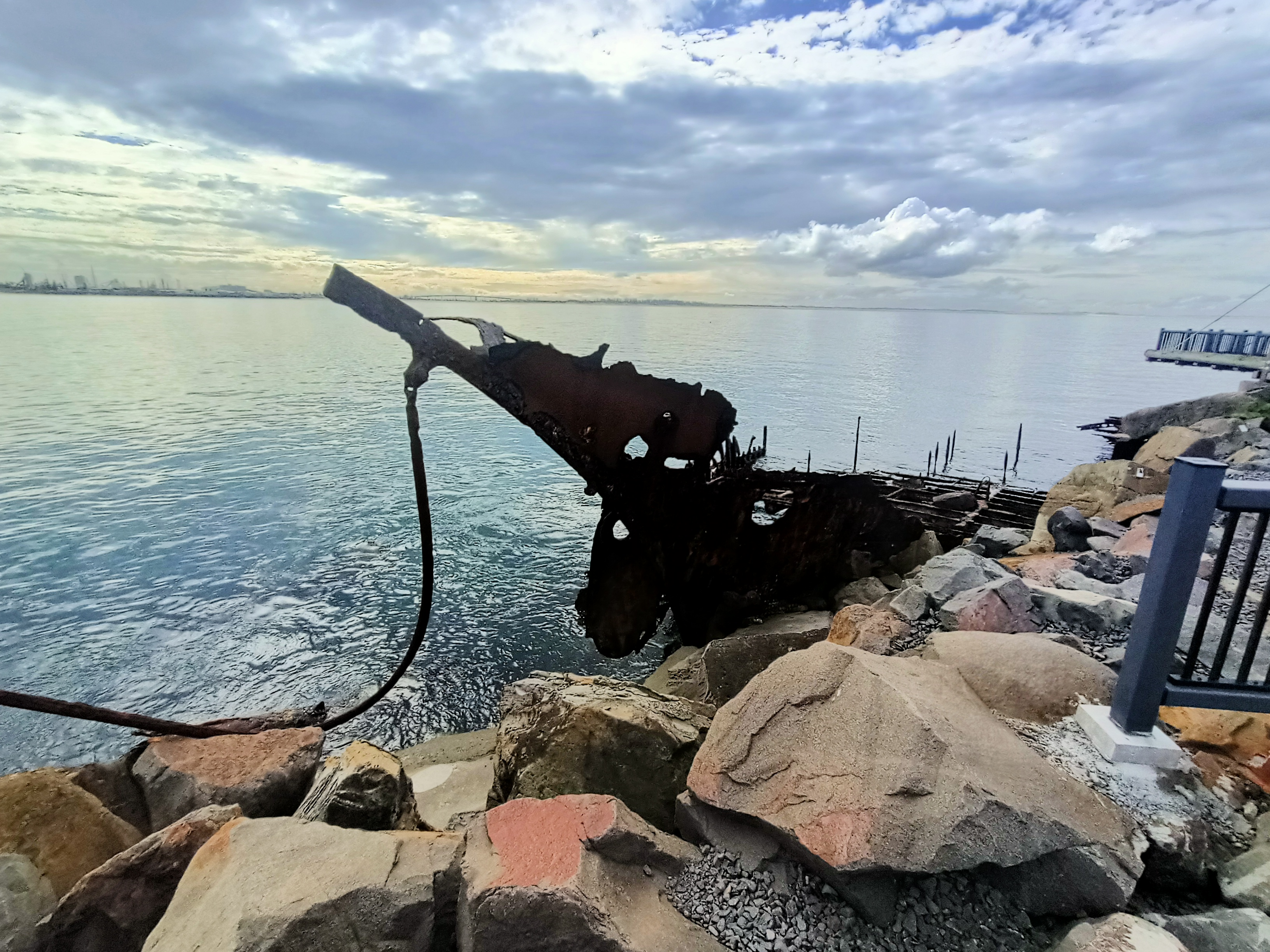
Bow view of the Adolphe wreck at Stockton Breakwall
