= 600-ship Navy =

United States Cold War–era defense plan

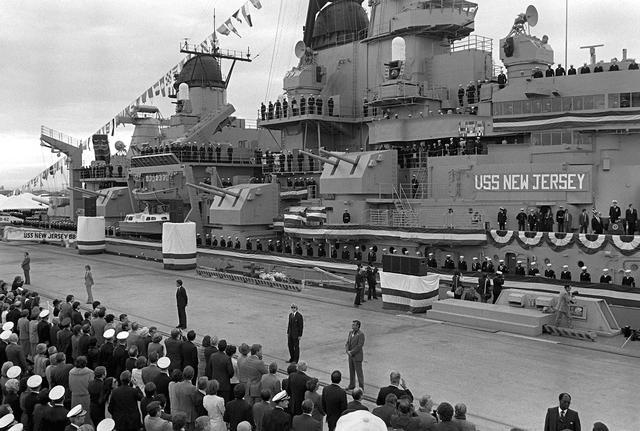
The recommissioning ceremony for USS New Jersey; President Ronald Reagan attended and gave the ship's orders.

The 600-ship Navy was a strategic plan of the United States Navy during the 1980s to rebuild its fleet after cutbacks that followed the end of the Vietnam War. The plan, which originated with Republican leaders, was an important campaign plank of Ronald Reagan in the 1980 presidential election, who advocated a larger military and strategic confrontation with the Soviet Union.

The number of ships peaked at 594 in 1987, before declining sharply after the end of the Cold War in 1989–1992.

The program included:

- Recommissioning the Iowa-class battleships
- Keeping older ships in service longer
- A large new construction program
- Stepping up production of Nimitz-class aircraft carriers

The idea was supported by John F. Lehman, who became Reagan's Secretary of the Navy, and Caspar Weinberger, Reagan's Secretary of Defense.

The plan was cancelled after the dissolution of the Soviet Union.

== Background ==
The idea behind the 600-ship Navy can be traced back to the Vietnam War. During the war, the armed services rapidly expanded to meet the demands placed on them.

The Soviet Union, which had been supporting North Vietnam, began staging their naval vessels from former U.S. ports in South Vietnam. Building on this gain, Soviet vessels began to sail in all seven seas with increased vigor and even ventured into the Gulf of Mexico. Soviet forces also stepped up infantry, armor, and air force deployments in Eastern Europe.

== Reagan plan ==
It was against this backdrop in 1980 that the United States began an election year. President Reagan continued this in 1984, releasing a campaign commercial "Bear," which played on the use of the bear as a national symbol of Russia in order to promote higher vigilance and defense expenditures against the Soviet Union.

The overseas strategic retaliation arm was strengthened and the development of new weaponry like the B-1B bomber, the Bradley fighting vehicle, and the Abrams tank was completed and they were put into production.

Lehman attempted to "front-load" the program, by committing the Navy to the building program, but in the end the funds were not available and it fell short.

== Ships and weapons systems deployed during the plan ==
The Navy saw the largest benefit of the rebuilding. Under the Reagan administration, the first of the Ohio-class ballistic missile submarines were completed. This class was the largest submarine ever built in the U.S. The ship carried 24 Trident I nuclear-capable missiles, each one with a 4,000-mile (6,400 km) range. Construction of the Nimitz class of supercarriers and Los Angeles-class attack submarines were dramatically stepped up. The revolutionary new Aegis Combat System was installed on the upcoming Ticonderoga-class ships, production of which was also stepped up. Several aircraft carriers were put through Service Life Extension Programs (SLEPs) aimed at keeping them in service longer. The Iowa-class battleships, built in the 1940s, were all recommissioned and refitted with RGM-84 Harpoon, BGM-109 Tomahawk, and Phalanx CIWS system capabilities, plus their armor plating would be more resilient against anti-ship missiles. The first Harpoons, Tomahawks, and AGM-88 HARM missiles all debuted on the navy's ships. Naval aviation was stepped up with the introduction of the F/A-18 Hornet, along with improved versions of the EA-6 Prowler electronic countermeasure aircraft, the A-6 Intruder, and the F-14 Tomcat. In addition, the nation's strategic retaliatory arm was strengthened with advanced B-1B bombers and deploying Pershing II theater missiles to Europe. The initiative also included deployment of Abrams main battle tanks and Bradley armored fighting vehicles. U.S. Navy unclassified miscellaneous ships, auxiliary ships, and yard ships are not included in the ship count.

== Build-up by year ==
Aircraft carriers

Class of ships	Image	1980	1981	1982	1983	1984	1985	1986	1987	1988	1989	1990
Nimitz class		2	2	3	3	3	3	4	4	4	5	5
USS Enterprise (CVN-65)		1	1	1	1	1	1	1	1	1	1	1
Kitty Hawk class		4	4	4	4	4	4	4	4	4	4	4
Forrestal class		4	4	4	4	4	4	4	4	4	4	4
Midway class		2	2	2	2	2	2	2	2	2	2	2
Essex class		1	1	1	1	1	1	1	1	1	1	1
Total	Ships	14	14	15	15	15	15	16	16	16	17	17

Battleships

Class of ships	Image	1980	1981	1982	1983	1984	1985	1986	1987	1988	1989	1990
Iowa class		0	0	0	1	2	2	3	3	4	4	4
Total	Ships	0	0	0	1	2	2	3	3	4	4	4

Cruisers

Class of ships	Image	1980	1981	1982	1983	1984	1985	1986	1987	1988	1989	1990
Ticonderoga class		0	0	0	1	2	3	5	9	11	15	16
Virginia class		4	4	4	4	4	4	4	4	4	4	4
California class		2	2	2	2	2	2	2	2	2	2	2
USS Truxtun (CGN-35)		1	1	1	1	1	1	1	1	1	1	1
Belknap class		9	9	9	9	9	9	9	9	9	9	9
Leahy class		9	9	9	9	9	9	9	9	9	9	9
Long Beach class		1	1	1	1	1	1	1	1	1	1	1
Total	Ships	26	26	26	27	28	29	31	35	37	41	42

Destroyers

Class of ships	Image	1980	1981	1982	1983	1984	1985	1986	1987	1988	1989	1990
Kidd class		0	3	4	4	4	4	4	4	4	4	4
Spruance class		30	30	30	31	31	31	31	31	31	31	31
Charles F. Adams class		23	23	23	23	23	23	23	23	23	20	10
Farragut class		10	10	10	10	10	10	10	10	10	8	7
Forrest Sherman class		18	18	7	1	1	1	1	1	0	0	0
Gearing class		14	7	2	0	0	0	0	0	0	0	0
Total	Ships	95	91	76	69	69	69	69	69	68	63	52

Frigates

Class of ships	Image	1980	1981	1982	1983	1984	1985	1986	1987	1988	1989	1990
Oliver Hazard Perry class		8	17	26	37	45	50	52	54	54	55	55
Knox class		46	46	46	46	46	46	46	46	46	46	46
Brooke class		6	6	6	6	6	6	6	6	1	0	0
Garcia class		11	11	11	11	11	11	11	11	5	1	0
Bronstein class		2	2	2	2	2	2	2	2	2	2	2
Total	Ships	73	82	91	102	110	115	117	119	108	104	103

Years	1980	1981	1982	1983	1984	1985	1986	1987	1988	1989	1990
Total major combatants active	208	213	208	214	224	230	236	242	232	229	218

Amphibious assault ship

Class of ships	Image	1980	1981	1982	1983	1984	1985	1986	1987	1988	1989	1990
Wasp class		0	0	0	0	0	0	0	0	0	1	1
Tarawa class		5	5	5	5	5	5	5	5	5	5	5
Iwo Jima class		7	7	7	7	7	7	7	7	7	7	7
Total	Ships	12	12	12	12	12	12	12	12	12	13	13

Dock landing ship

Class of ships	Image	1980	1981	1982	1983	1984	1985	1986	1987	1988	1989	1990
Whidbey Island class		0	0	0	0	0	1	2	3	3	4	5
Anchorage class		5	5	5	5	5	5	5	5	5	5	5
Thomaston class		8	8	8	6	4	3	3	3	3	1	0
Casa Grande class		1	1	1	1	1	1	1	1	1	0	0
Total	Ships	14	14	14	12	10	10	11	12	12	10	10

Amphibious transport dock

Class of ships	Image	1980	1981	1982	1983	1984	1985	1986	1987	1988	1989	1990
Austin class		12	12	12	12	12	12	12	12	12	12	12
Raleigh class		3	3	3	3	3	3	3	3	3	3	3
Total	Ships	15	15	15	15	15	15	15	15	15	15	15

Amphibious cargo ship

Class of ships	Image	1980	1981	1982	1983	1984	1985	1986	1987	1988	1989	1990
Charleston class		5	5	5	5	5	5	5	5	5	5	5
USS Tulare (AKA-112)		1	1	1	1	1	1	0	0	0	0	0
Total	Ships	6	6	6	6	6	6	5	5	5	5	5

Tank landing ship

Class of ships	Image	1980	1981	1982	1983	1984	1985	1986	1987	1988	1989	1990
Newport class		20	20	20	20	20	20	20	20	20	20	20
General Frank S. Besson class		0	0	0	0	0	0	0	2	4	4	4
Total	Ships	20	20	20	20	20	20	20	22	24	24	24

Years	1980	1981	1982	1983	1984	1985	1986	1987	1988	1989	1990
Total amphibious active	67	67	67	65	63	63	63	66	68	67	67

Command Ship

Class of ships	Image	1980	1981	1982	1983	1984	1985	1986	1987	1988	1989	1990
Blue Ridge class		2	2	2	2	2	2	2	2	2	2	2
Total	Ships	2	2	2	2	2	2	2	2	2	2	2

Hospital ship

Class of ships	Image	1980	1981	1982	1983	1984	1985	1986	1987	1988	1989	1990
Mercy class		0	0	0	0	0	0	1	2	2	2	2
Total	Ships	0	0	0	0	0	0	1	2	2	2	2

Minesweeper

Class of ships	Image	1980	1981	1982	1983	1984	1985	1986	1987	1988	1989	1990
Avenger class		0	0	0	0	0	0	0	1	1	3	3
Aggressive class		19	19	19	19	19	19	19	19	19	18	14
Total	Ships	19	19	19	19	19	19	19	20	20	21	17

Patrol ships

Class of ships	Image	1980	1981	1982	1983	1984	1985	1986	1987	1988	1989	1990
Pegasus class		1	1	2	6	6	6	6	6	6	6	6
Asheville class		9	9	9	9	6	6	6	4	4	4	4
Total	Ships	10	10	11	15	12	12	12	10	10	10	10

Replenishment oiler

Class of ships	Image	1980	1981	1982	1983	1984	1985	1986	1987	1988	1989	1990
Henry J. Kaiser class		0	0	0	0	0	0	1	4	6	8	9
Cimarron class		0	3	4	5	5	5	5	5	5	5	5
Wichita class		7	7	7	7	7	7	7	7	7	7	7
Total	Ships	7	10	11	12	12	12	13	16	18	20	21

Tanker

Class of ships	Image	1980	1981	1982	1983	1984	1985	1986	1987	1988	1989	1990
USNS Lawrence H. Gianella (T-AOT-1125)		0	0	0	0	0	0	1	1	1	1	1
SS class		1	2	2	2	2	2	2	3	3	3	3
Total	Ships	1	2	2	2	2	2	3	4	4	4	4

Ammunition ship

Class of ships	Image	1980	1981	1982	1983	1984	1985	1986	1987	1988	1989	1990
Kilauea class		8	8	8	8	8	8	8	8	8	8	8
Nitro class		3	3	3	3	3	3	3	3	3	3	3
Total	Ships	11	11	11	11	11	11	11	11	11	11	11

Combat stores ship

Class of ships	Image	1980	1981	1982	1983	1984	1985	1986	1987	1988	1989	1990
Mars class		7	7	7	7	7	7	7	7	7	7	7
Sirius class		0	2	2	3	3	3	3	3	3	3	3
Total	Ships	7	9	9	10	10	10	10	10	10	10	10

Fast combat support ships

Class of ships	Image	1980	1981	1982	1983	1984	1985	1986	1987	1988	1989	1990
Sacramento class		4	4	4	4	4	4	4	4	4	4	4
Total	Ships	4	4	4	4	4	4	4	4	4	4	4

Roll-on/roll-off

Class of ships	Image	1980	1981	1982	1983	1984	1985	1986	1987	1988	1989	1990
Algol class		0	0	0	0	8	8	8	8	8	8	8
Cape Island class		4	4	4	4	4	4	4	4	4	4	4
Cape Ducato class		0	0	0	0	0	5	5	5	5	5	5
Cape Ducato class		0	0	0	0	0	0	3	3	3	3	3
Total	Ships	7	9	9	10	10	10	10	10	10	10	10

Destroyer tender

Class of ships	Image	1980	1981	1982	1983	1984	1985	1986	1987	1988	1989	1990
Yellowstone class		1	2	3	4	4	4	4	4	4	4	4
Samuel Gompers class		2	2	2	2	2	2	2	2	2	2	2
Shenandoah class		1	1	0	0	0	0	0	0	0	0	0
Total	Ships	4	5	5	6	6	6	6	6	6	6	6

Submarine tender

Class of ships	Image	1980	1981	1982	1983	1984	1985	1986	1987	1988	1989	1990
Emory S. Land class		2	3	3	3	3	3	3	3	3	3	3
USS L. Y. Spear (AS-36)		1	1	1	1	1	1	1	1	1	1	1
Total	Ships	3	4	4	4	4	4	4	4	4	4	4

Crane ship

Class of ships	Image	1980	1981	1982	1983	1984	1985	1986	1987	1988	1989	1990
Keystone State class		0	0	0	0	2	2	3	5	5	7	7
Gopher State class		1	1	1	1	2	2	3	3	3	3	3
Total	Ships	1	1	1	1	4	4	6	8	8	10	10

Heavy-lift ship

Class of ships	Image	1980	1981	1982	1983	1984	1985	1986	1987	1988	1989	1990
American Cormorant		0	0	0	0	0	1	1	1	1	1	1
Total	Ships	0	0	0	0	0	1	1	1	1	1	1

Cable ship

Class of ships	Image	1980	1981	1982	1983	1984	1985	1986	1987	1988	1989	1990
USNS Zeus (T-ARC-7)		0	0	0	0	1	1	1	1	1	1	1
Total	Ships	0	0	0	0	1	1	1	1	1	1	1

Rescue and salvage ship

Class of ships	Image	1980	1981	1982	1983	1984	1985	1986	1987	1988	1989	1990
Safeguard class		0	0	0	1	1	2	4	4	4	4	4
Pigeon class		2	2	2	2	2	2	2	2	2	2	2
Bolster class		6	6	6	6	6	6	6	6	6	6	6
Total	Ships	8	8	8	9	9	10	12	12	12	12	12

Tracking ship

Class of ships	Image	1980	1981	1982	1983	1984	1985	1986	1987	1988	1989	1990
USNS Observation Island (T-AGM-23)		1	1	1	1	1	1	1	1	1	1	1
USS Range Sentinel (AGM-22)		1	1	1	1	1	1	1	1	1	1	1
USNS Vanguard (T-AG-194)		1	1	1	1	1	1	1	1	1	1	1
Total	Ships	3	3	3	3	3	3	3	3	3	3	3

Ocean surveillance ship

Class of ships	Image	1980	1981	1982	1983	1984	1985	1986	1987	1988	1989	1990
Stalwart class		0	0	0	0	3	7	9	11	13	17	18
Total	Ships	0	0	0	0	3	7	9	11	13	17	18

Oceanographic research ship

Class of ships	Image	1980	1981	1982	1983	1984	1985	1986	1987	1988	1989	1990
USNS Hayes (T-AGOR-16)		1	1	1	1	1	1	1	1	1	1	1
Total	Ships	1	1	1	1	1	1	1	1	1	1	1

Years	1980	1981	1982	1983	1984	1985	1986	1987	1988	1989	1990
Total auxiliary active	88	98	100	109	113	119	128	136	140	149	147

Years	1980	1981	1982	1983	1984	1985	1986	1987	1988	1989	1990
Total surface active	363	378	375	388	400	412	427	444	440	445	432

Attack submarines

Class of ships	Image	1980	1981	1982	1983	1984	1985	1986	1987	1988	1989	1990
Los Angeles class		10	16	20	25	29	33	35	37	39	42	44
Sturgeon class		37	37	37	37	37	37	37	37	37	37	37
Permit class		13	13	13	13	13	13	13	13	12	10	8
Skipjack class		5	5	5	5	5	5	4	4	3	3	0
Barbel class		3	3	3	3	3	3	3	3	2	1	0
Skate class		4	4	4	4	3	3	2	2	1	0	0
USS Seawolf (SSN-575)		1	1	1	1	1	1	0	0	0	0	0
USS Darter (SS-576)		1	1	1	1	1	1	1	1	1	1	0
Tang class		3	3	3	2	2	2	1	0	0	0	0
Total	Subs	77	83	87	91	94	98	96	97	95	94	89

Ballistic missile submarines

Class of ships	Image	1980	1981	1982	1983	1984	1985	1986	1987	1988	1989	1990
Ohio class		0	1	2	3	5	6	8	8	9	10	11
Benjamin Franklin class		12	12	12	12	12	12	12	12	12	12	12
James Madison class		10	10	10	10	10	10	9	9	9	8	8
Lafayette class		9	9	9	9	9	9	8	8	8	6	3
Ethan Allen class		5	5	5	3	3	2	2	2	2	2	2
George Washington class		5	4	3	2	1	0	0	0	0	0	0
Total	Subs	41	41	41	39	40	39	39	39	40	38	36

Years	1980	1981	1982	1983	1984	1985	1986	1987	1988	1989	1990
Total submarines active	118	124	128	130	134	137	135	136	135	132	125

Years	1980	1981	1982	1983	1984	1985	1986	1987	1988	1989	1990
Total active fleet	481	502	503	518	534	549	562	580	575	577	557

== End of the plan ==
Eventually political pressure to reduce the national budget deficit resulted in Congress reversing itself and passing a series of declining defense budgets beginning in 1986. Weinberger clashed with Congress over the cuts, resigning in late 1987, and was succeeded by Frank Carlucci. Furthermore, concerns were raised about how the expansion of the Navy would reduce attention and resources needed in other scenarios where the Soviets also had to be confronted such as Europe.

Lehman's successor as Navy Secretary, Jim Webb, remained a fierce proponent of the expanded fleet, and disagreed with Carlucci over how to cut the Navy budget in line with other services. Webb resigned rather than endorse Carlucci's cut of 16 frigates. As revealed in The Reagan Diaries, Reagan reflected about Webb's resignation on 22 February 1988: "Present Sec. Webb resigned over budget cuts. I don't think Navy was sorry to see him go."

Following the dissolution of the Soviet Union in the early 1990s and the lack of a perceived threat against the United States, several of the Reagan administration's policies and plans, such as the "600-ship Navy", were scaled back or abandoned. U.S. bases across Europe and North America were slowly decommissioned and closed, others were mothballed through the Base Realignment and Closure (BRAC) process. In the Navy, this resulted in the retirement of several older carriers, the decommissioning of all four of the Iowa-class battleships and the cancellation of the remaining Seawolf-class submarines.

== See also ==
- Cold War (1979–1985)
- Cold War (1985–1991)
- List of ships of the United States Navy
- National Defense Reserve Fleet
- United States Navy ships
