= French destroyer L'Adroit (1927) =

Destroyer of the French Navy

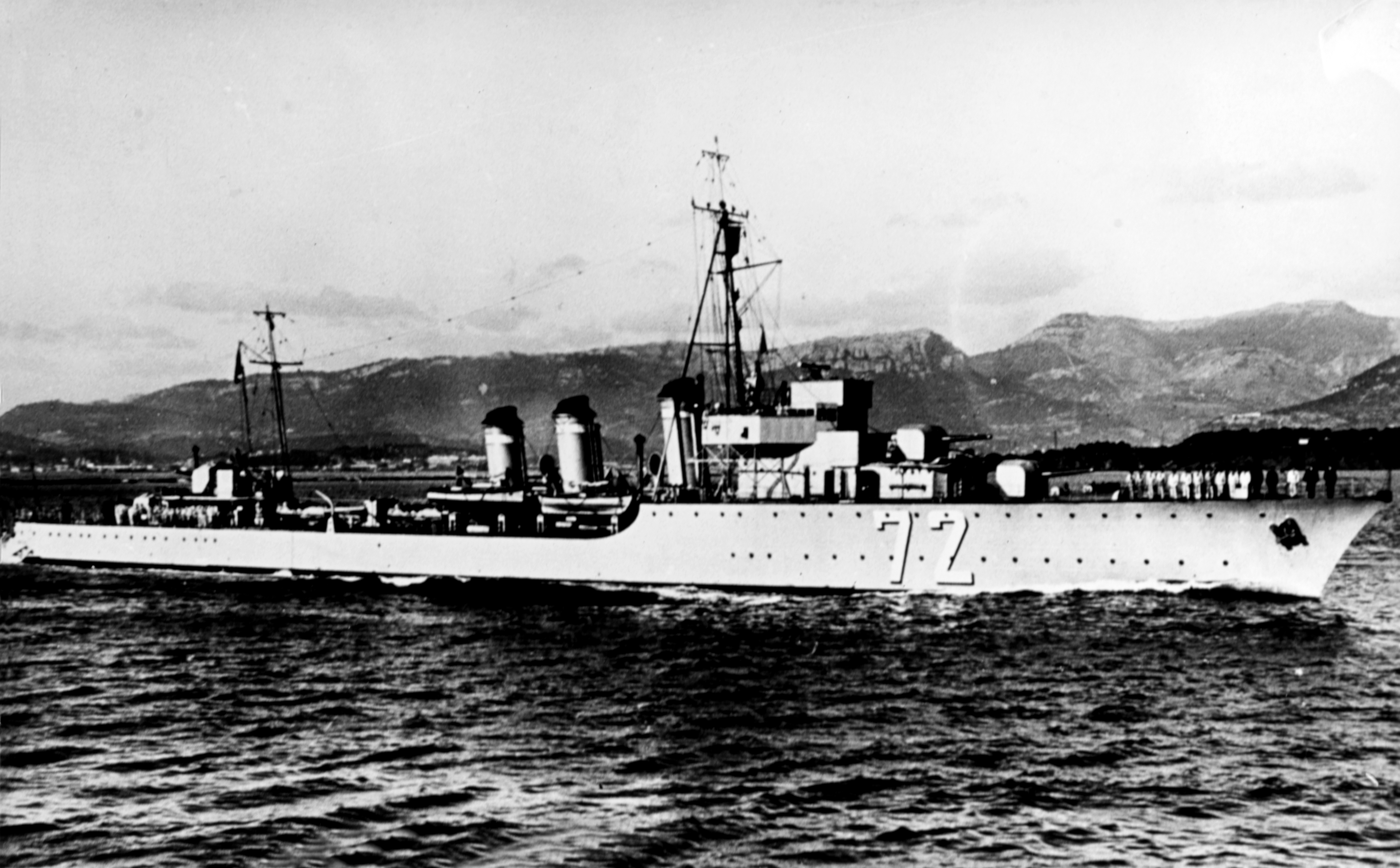
- L'Adroit in the 1930s

History

France
- Name: L'Adroit
- Ordered: 25 November 1924
- Builder: Ateliers et Chantiers de France, Dunkerque
- Laid down: 26 April 1925
- Launched: 1 April 1927
- Completed: 1 July 1929
- In service: October 1929
- Fate: Sunk, 21 May 1940

General characteristics
- Class & type: L'Adroit-class destroyer
- Displacement: 1,380 t (1,360 long tons) (standard)
- Length: 107.2 m (351 ft 8 in)
- Beam: 9.9 m (32 ft 6 in)
- Draft: 3.5 m (11 ft 6 in)
- Installed power: 3 du Temple boilers; 31,000 PS (22,800 kW; 30,576 shp)
- Propulsion: 2 shafts; 2 geared steam turbines
- Speed: 33 knots (61 km/h; 38 mph)
- Range: 3,000 nmi (5,600 km; 3,500 mi) at 15 knots (28 km/h; 17 mph)
- Crew: 9 officers, 153 crewmen (wartime)
- Armament: 4 × single 130 mm (5.1 in) guns; 2 × single 37 mm (1.5 in) AA guns; 2 × triple 550 mm (21.7 in) torpedo tubes; 2 chutes and 2 throwers for 22 depth charges

The French destroyer L’Adroit was the lead ship of her class of destroyers built for the French Navy during the 1920s.

== Design and description ==
The L'Adroit class was a slightly enlarged and improved version of the preceding Bourrasque class. The ships had an overall length of 107.2 meters (351 ft 8 in), a beam of 9.9 meters (32 ft 6 in), and a draft of 3.5 meters (11 ft 6 in). The ships displaced 1,380 metric tons (1,360 long tons) at standard load and 2,000 metric tons (2,000 long tons) at deep load. They were powered by two geared steam turbines, each driving one propeller shaft, using steam provided by three du Temple boilers. The turbines were designed to produce 31,000 metric horsepower (22,800 kW; 30,576 shp), which would propel the ships at 33 knots (61 km/h; 38 mph). The ships carried 386 metric tons (380 long tons) of fuel oil which gave them a range of 3,000 nautical miles (5,600 km; 3,500 mi) at 15 knots (28 km/h; 17 mph).

The main armament of the L'Adroit-class ships consisted of four Canon de 130 mm Modèle 1924 guns in single mounts, one superfiring pair each fore and aft of the superstructure. Their anti-aircraft armament consisted of a pair of Canon de 37 mm Modèle 1925 guns. The ships carried two above-water triple sets of 550-millimeter (21.7 in) torpedo tubes. A pair of depth charge chutes were built into their stern; these housed a total of sixteen 200-kilogram (440 lb) depth charges. In addition two depth charge throwers were fitted for which six 100-kilogram (220 lb) depth charges were carried.

== Construction and career ==
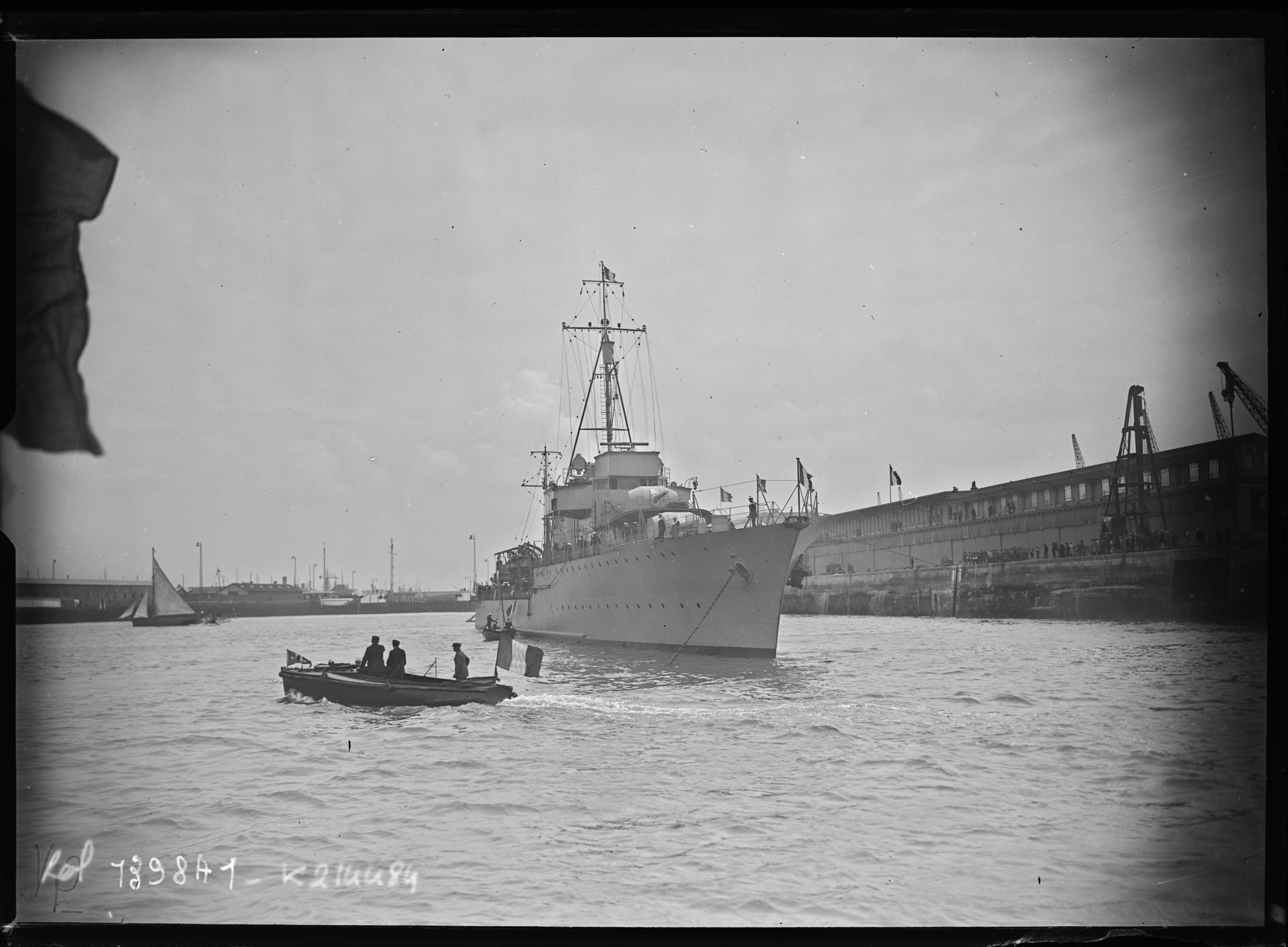
L’Adroit in Le Havre on 2 August 1929

L’Adroit ("the skilful one") was built at A C de France at Dunkirk. She was laid down on 26 May 1925, launched on 1 April 1927 and completed 1 July 1929. She was in action during the first months of World War II, and with the invasion of France and the Low Countries and was involved with the evacuation of the British and French forces from Dunkirk.

On 21 May 1940 she was critically damaged in an attack by German He 111 bombers. Captain Henri Dupin de Saint-Cyr beached the ship near the commune Malo-Les-Bains. Sitting on the beach, the wreck later suffered an explosion in the forward magazine, which created a huge gap between bridge and bow. All crewmembers survived.

== In popular culture ==
For the 2017 film Dunkirk by Christopher Nolan, the wreck of L'Adroit was reconstructed as a model. For filming, it was placed in the sea, close to the beach at the commune Malo-les-Bains.
