= SS Viet-Nam =

French ocean liner built in 1953

History
- Name: 1972–1976: Malaysia Kita; 1971–1972: Malaysia Baru; 1970–1971: Princess Abeto; 1967–1970: Pacifique; 1953–1967: Viet-Nam
- Owner: 1953–1970: Messageries Maritimes; 1970–1976: Abeto SA
- Operator: 1953–1970: Messageries Maritimes; 1966–1967: Club Mediterranée; 1970–1974: Abeto SA
- Builder: Societe des Ateliers & Chantiers, Dunkirk
- Launched: 14 October 1951
- Maiden voyage: 17 July 1953
- Out of service: 12 May 1974
- Identification: IMO number: 5380118
- Fate: Destroyed by fire and capsized in Singapore harbour, 12 May 1974. Scrapped in Kaohsiung in 1976.

General characteristics
- Type: Ocean liner/cruise ship
- Tonnage: 12,200 GRT; 6,400 DWT (as built); 13,473 GRT; 5,820 DWT (1961 refit)
- Length: 162.1 m (531 ft 10 in)
- Beam: 22 m (72 ft 2 in)
- Installed power: Parsons geared turbines
- Propulsion: Twin screws
- Speed: 23 knots (43 km/h; 26 mph)
- Capacity: 279 passengers; 1,600 passengers (1970 rebuild)

SS Viet-Nam was an ocean liner built in Dunkirk, France for Messageries Maritimes in 1953. Viet-Nam was built along with two sister ships, SS Cambodge and SS Laos (all three were nicknamed 'les blancs'/the 'whites' by their crews, because of their colour). She mainly provided passenger service between France, the Middle East, Southeast Asia, and Japan.

Viet-Nam was renamed Pacifique in 1967, and was sold to Malaysian owners in 1970 for use as a pilgrim ship to Mecca. Pacifique (renamed several times since 1970) was destroyed by fire and capsized at Singapore in 1974, and was broken up at Kaohsiung, Taiwan, in 1976.

== Construction ==
The French shipping company Messageries Maritimes ordered three identical ships to be built around the late 1940s to provide passenger and mixed-freight service on a route between Marseilles and Yokohama via ports in South Asia. The first to be completed was Viet-Nam in 1952, which was built by Société des Ateliers & Chantiers in Dunkirk, Nord, in northern France. The name was derived from Vietnam. She was launched on 14 October 1951, then completed and delivered to Messageries Maritimes in July 1953. The second and third ships of the class, Cambodge and Laos, were completed in 1953 and 1954.

Viet-Nam and her sisters were mid-sized liners. The ship was 12,200 gross register tons (GRT), 531 feet (162 m) long with a beam of 72 feet (22 m). She was powered by twin Parsons geared turbines, which gave her a cruising speed of 21 knots (39 km/h; 24 mph). Viet-Nam could carry 279 passengers on 7 decks — 117 in first class, 110 in second (tourist) class, and 52 in third (steerage or cabin) class.

== Career ==
Viet-Nam departed on her maiden voyage on 17 July 1953. Her route linked Marseilles with various ports along the Suez Canal, Red Sea, Indian Ocean, South China Sea, and western Pacific Ocean. From Marseilles, she sailed across the Mediterranean Sea and through the Suez Canal and Red Sea to Port Said and Suez in Egypt, Aden in Yemen; Djibouti; across the Indian Ocean to Bombay, India; Colombo, Sri Lanka; and the island of Singapore; through the South China Sea to Saigon, Vietnam; Manila, Philippines; Hong Kong, and along the Pacific coast of Asia to finally reach Kobe and Yokohama in Japan. In 1961, Viet-Nam was refit, increasing the space of the vessels third class cabin space, and increasing her tonnage to 13,473. In 1966, Viet-Nam was chartered to Club Mediterranée for use as a cruise ship, but was unsuccessful due to financial issues. Viet-Nam served just three cruises under charter before the Six-Day War closed the Suez Canal, putting an end to the charter.

On 29 September 1967, Viet-Nam was renamed Pacifique, and continued regular passenger service until 1970, when Viet-Nam and her sister ship Laos were sold to Abeto SA. Renamed Princess Abeto, the vessel was rebuilt to carry over 1,600 Muslim pilgrims to Mecca. Viet-Nam's other sister ship, Cambodge, was bought by Sun Lines, a Greek cruise line, converted into a cruise ship, and ultimately scrapped at Alang, India, in 2003. Princess Abeto was renamed Malaysia Baru in 1971, and Malaysia Kita in 1972.

== Fate ==
On 12 May 1974, Malaysia Kita caught fire and capsized while anchored under repairs in Singapore harbor. There were no casualties, and the wreck of Malaysia Kita was refloated in June 1975, and sold for scrap at Kaohsiung, Taiwan, arriving in May 1976 to be broken up.
