= Wendouree (1882) =

Ship

Coordinates: 32.914°S 151.797°E

History

Australia
- Name: Wendouree
- Owner: Huddart Parker & Co. Pty. Ltd, Geelong
- Route: Newcastle to Adelaide
- Builder: S & H Morton & Co., Leith, Scotland
- Launched: 18 April 1882
- Identification: 84943
- Fate: Wrecked on 20 July 1898 Newcastle, New South Wales, Oyster Bank

General characteristics
- Type: Steel Steamer Screw
- Tonnage: 1,640 GRT; 1,066 NRT
- Length: 83.45 m
- Beam: 11.06 m
- Draught: 5.882 m
- Propulsion: Compound engine
- Complement: 24

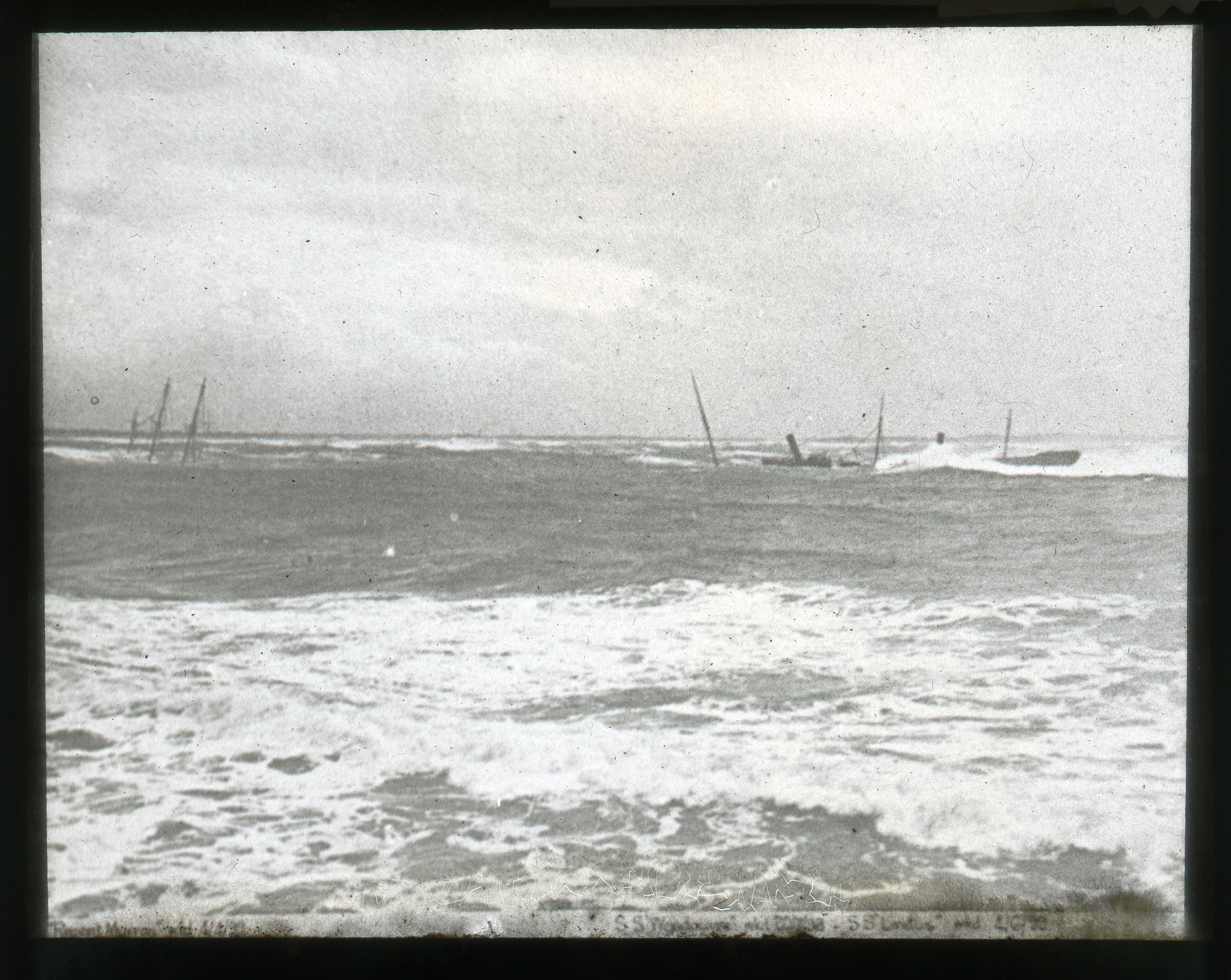
Shipwrecks Regent Murray, Wendouree and Lindus, Newcastle Harbour, New South Wales, 1899

Wendouree was a steel steamship built as a collier by S & H Morton & Co., Leith, Scotland for Huddart Parker & Co. Pty. Ltd. She was later refitted to carry passengers for the Melbourne to Sydney run.

== Fate ==
She was wrecked on the Oyster Bank at the mouth of the Hunter River while leaving Newcastle for Adelaide on 20 July 1898. She was carrying 1,430 tons of coal and 200 tons of coke.
