= Boleh (yacht) =

Singaporean junk yacht

Coordinates: 51.449°N 2.592°W

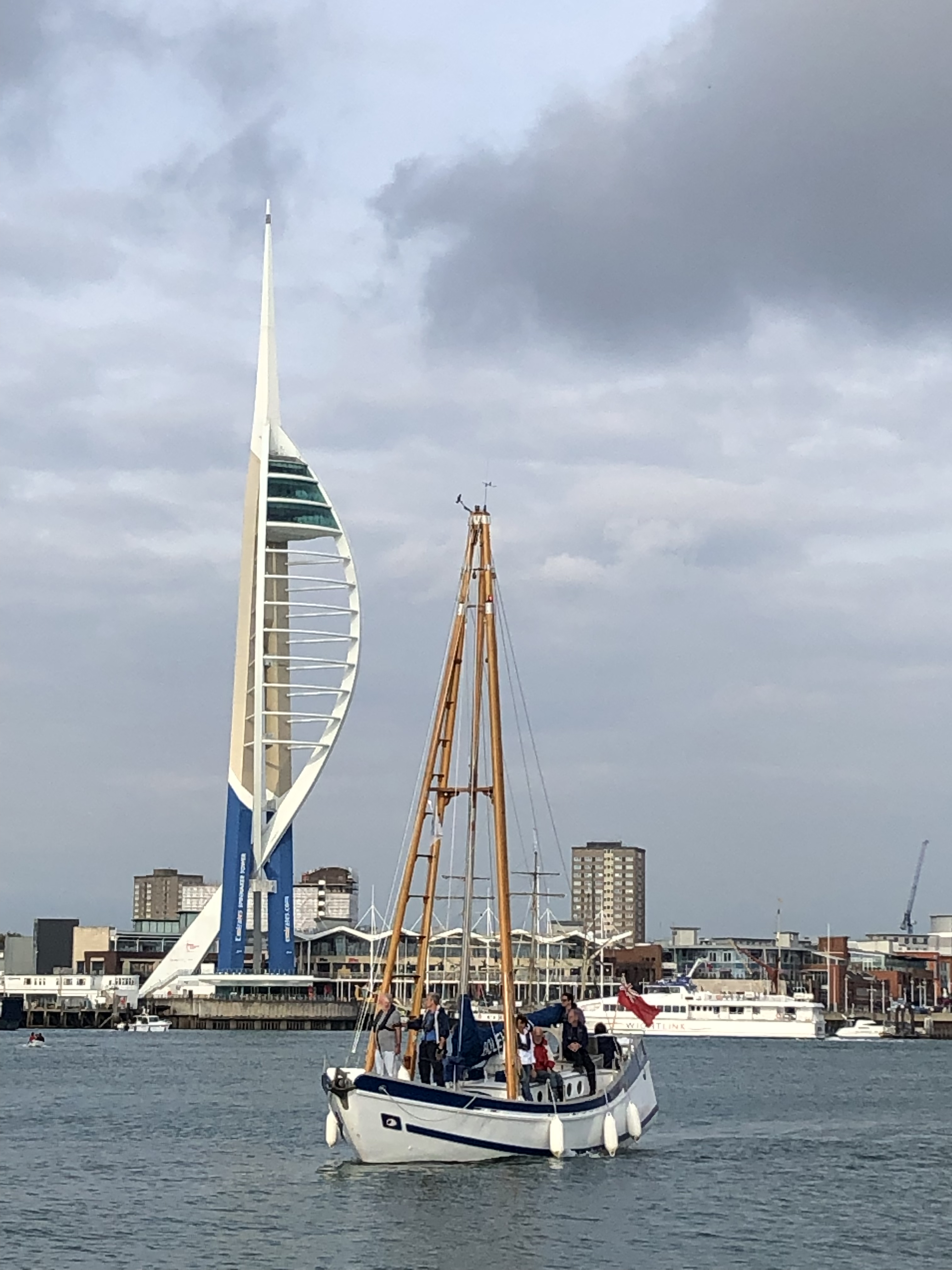
- 'Boleh' in 2019, Portsmouth Harbour and opposite Spinnaker Tower

History

England
- Name: Boleh
- Owner: The Boleh Trust
- Operator: The Boleh Trust
- Builder: Commander Robin Kilroy DSC, RN
- Laid down: September 1948
- Launched: 23 October 1949
- Sponsored by: Mrs Douglas Young
- In service: 1949
- Status: Operational

General characteristics
- Type: Junk yacht
- Displacement: 32 tons
- Length: 39.83 ft (12.14 m)
- Beam: 12.5 ft (3.8 m)
- Draught: 6.75 ft (2.06 m)
- Installed power: Diesel-electric drive
- Propulsion: Twin LMC Marlin13kW electric motors; Kiwiprop 430mm propellers
- Sail plan: Sliding Gunter yard

Boleh (the name means "Can do" in Malay) is a junk yacht built in Singapore in 1948-9 by Commander Robin Kilroy DSC Royal Navy, and now based in Chichester Harbour and operated along the South coast of England by the Boleh Trust.

== Design and construction ==
Kilroy, a keen sailor and painter, was posted to China in 1932, and was impressed by the hull designs of the local dhows and junks. He was also a fan of the Mediterranean lugsail rigs; and aimed to bring these elements together in a vessel which was safe, able to carry a heavy load, comfortable, fast downwind, easy to build, handsome, and if possible able to be sailed single-handed. Kilroy concluded that she was indeed a fast vessel, however research carried out in 2013 at the University of Southampton concluded that "the practicality and efficiency of Boleh’s unique rig is perhaps not what was hoped for by Cmdr. Kilroy when he designed the vessel ... any limited advantages [are] outweighed by significant issues with parasitic drag and practicality"; for example an optimum sailing angle around 50 degrees off the true wind, compared to the 40 degrees of more efficient rigs.

Kilroy, a Fleet Air Arm Swordfish pilot, who had commanded 815 Squadron during the Second World War, took the opportunity afforded by a post-war appointment to Singapore to build his vessel. He employed three skilled Malay craftsmen to assist in the construction, using space made available in the British Admiralty Dockyard. She was built using traditional skills and locally available materials: heavy chengal wood and, for the forward decklights, the windscreens of Japanese fighter aircraft. The vessel has a sliding gunter rig, an unstayed quadruped mast and, as originally built, wishbone booms: an arrangement which prevents the sail chafing as it would when set to windward of a conventional mast. On first encountering this "eccentric" vessel sailing writer Huw Williams described her mast ("or at least the structure that supports the sail") as "two tapering wooden ladders inclined inward and joined at the top ... I'd never seen anything like it. I still haven't." Kilroy also designed and constructed an early version of inboard/outboard propulsion, capable of driving the vessel at about four knots.

Construction, in 1948–1949, took 16 months and cost £3000.

== History ==
In 1950 Kilroy, with a crew of four (three to help sail the vessel and a cook) sailed her to the UK; arriving in Salcombe on 1 September. The crew consisted of John Rusher and Peter Aplin (both Royal Navy officers); George Jarvis(Born and raised in Salcombe), an Admiralty Dockyard Shipwright who had helped build the vessel; and Chang Hay Kun, the cook. The 14,000 nautical mile voyage took seven months and 12 days, and involved sailing via Sabang (Sumatra), Sri Lanka, the Seychelles, Madagascar, South Africa, St Helena, Ascension Island and the Cape Verde Islands. The three Naval officers were put on half pay for the duration of the voyage.

Once in the UK Boleh was initially based at Salcombe, before a move to the Solent in 1961.

Following Kilroy's death the boat left the family and passed into the possession of the Junior Leaders Regiment, Royal Engineers, at Dover, where she was used by Sea Cadets and young military personnel for sail training. In the late 1970s Boleh was sold to a German businessman: he spent £16,000 on refitting her, but almost immediately she was seriously damaged in an arson attack. In February 1978 joiner and entrepreneur Roger Angel purchased her as an insurance write-off; took her to a mud berth in Rye harbour and restored her; finishing the work in 1981 and making a maiden voyage to Brighton Marina. In 1984 Angel and his wife sailed the boat to the Mediterranean as a live-aboard; a voyage described (sympathetically) by the Hastings and St Leonards Observer as "Barmy".

A further 20 years later George and Henry Middleton, two of Kilroy's nephews, sought to find the yacht, and were eventually able to purchase her: they then set up a charitable trust to restore and, ultimately, operate the vessel; aiming to offer inspirational sailing experiences to those facing challenge in their lives. The restoration, at the Old Pumping Station in Eastney, and overseen by naval architect Graham Westbrook, designer of the propulsion system for the Royal barge Gloriana, cost over £500,000, took seven years, and involved the training of six apprentice shipwrights under the direction of lead shipwright and master craftsman Richard Uttley. In addition to new masts and extensive repairs on the hull and decks, Boleh received a twin screw diesel-electric auxiliary propulsion system. Grants included sums given by the National Lottery Heritage Fund and the Garfield Weston Foundation.

In 2015 Boleh was re-commissioned, and took part for the first time in the Association of Sail Training Organisations annual Small Ships Race. Later that year she was sailed to Falmouth, suffering a minor mechanical breakdown which was repaired in Yarmouth, Isle of Wight. She then spent 12 months being used by the charity Sea Sanctuary.

The vessel has been the subject of a number of articles in the sailing press, including a major article in Yachting monthly in December 1950; after she had completed the voyage to the United Kingdom.

== Gallery ==
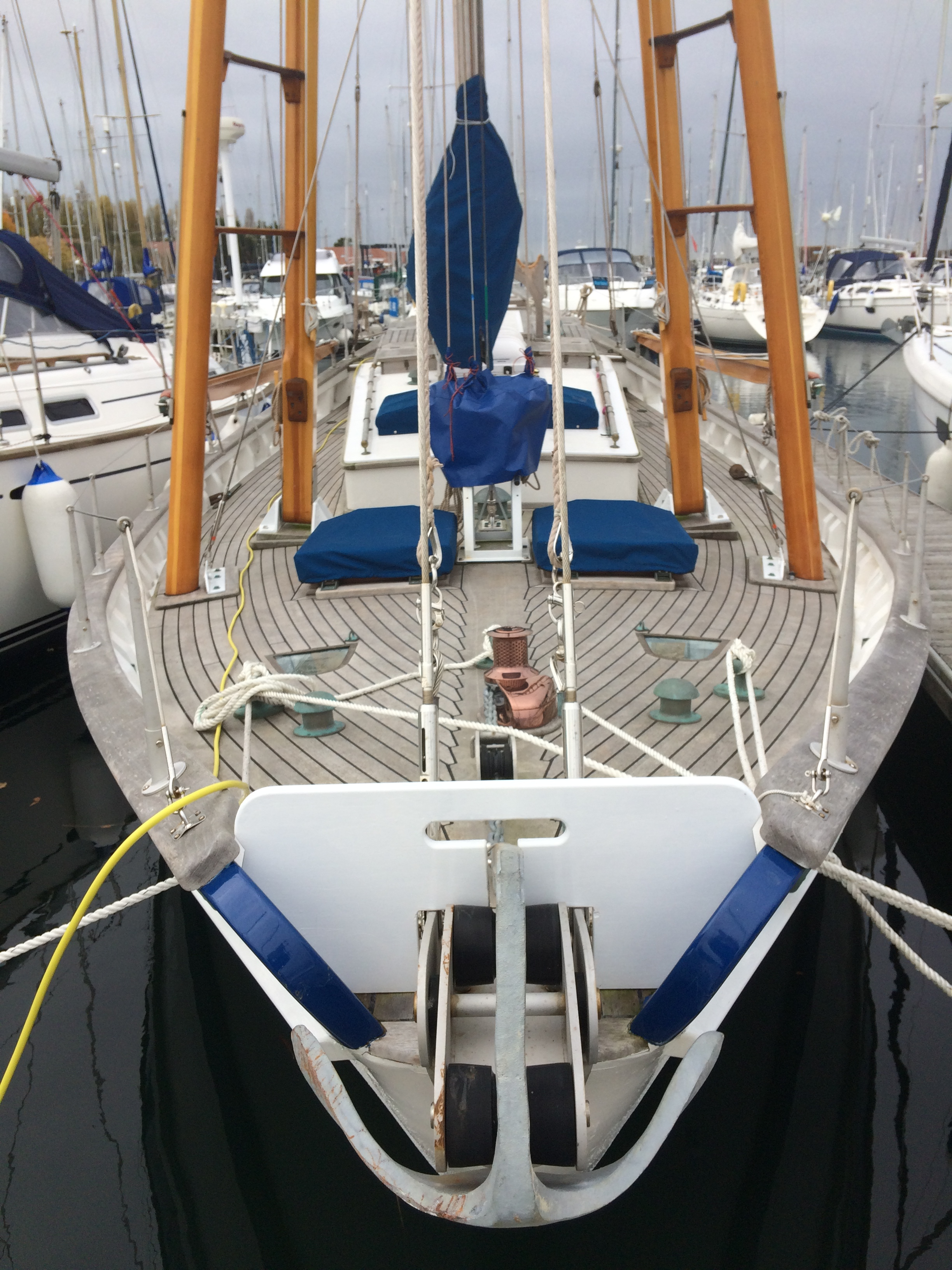
Boleh, viewed bows on, showing the lower part of her quadruped mast.

== Bibliography ==
- Kilroy, Robin Alexander (1951). Boleh: An account of the voyage of a Malay junk yacht. London, England: Hodder & Stoughton.
