= Cape Ducato-class vehicle cargo ship =

Five cargo ships of the United States Navy

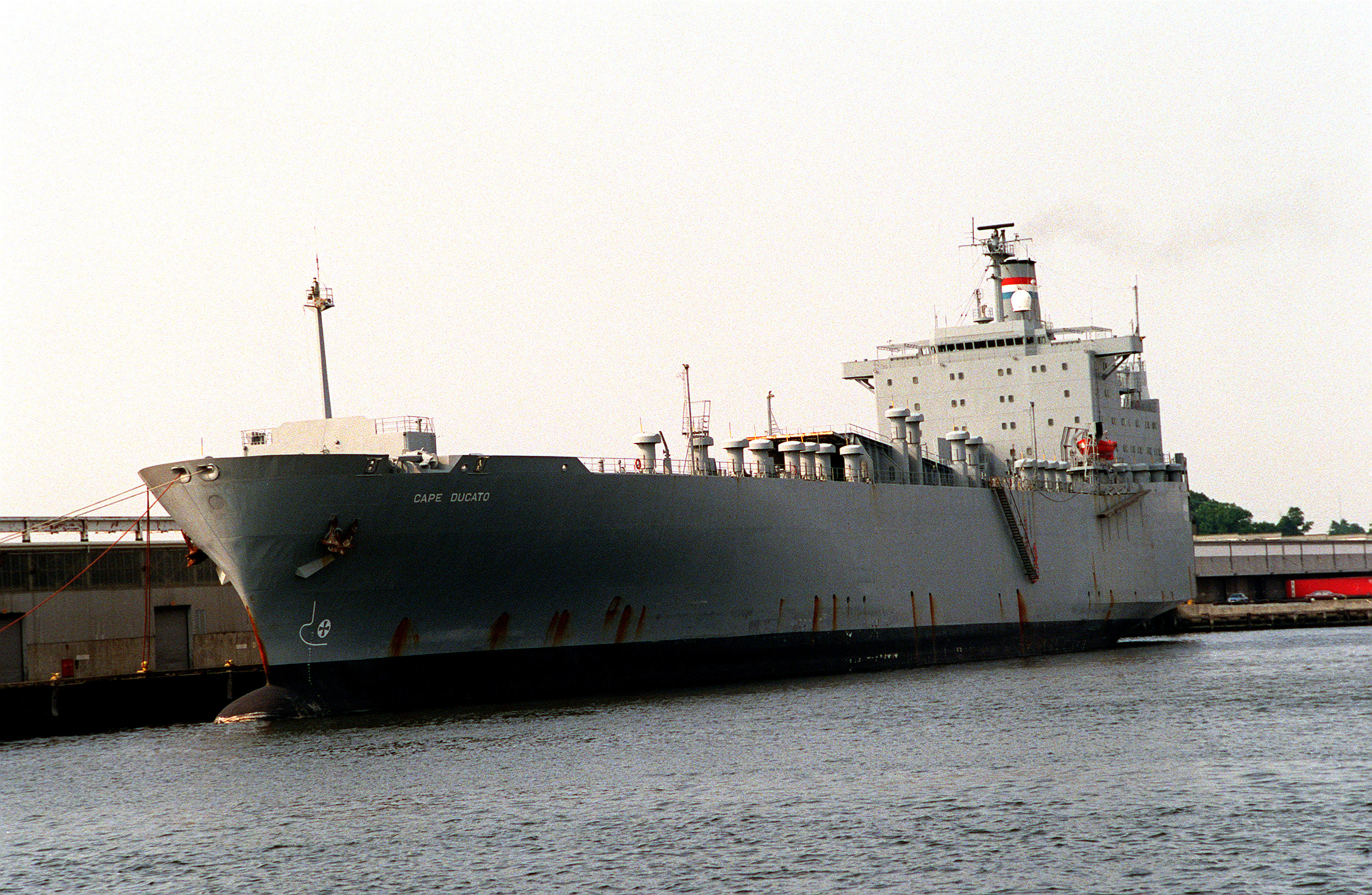
- Cape Ducato (T-AKR-5051) in 1991

Class overview
- Builders: Eriksbergs MV AB, Sweden; Ateliers et Chantiers de France
- Operators: United States Navy Military Sealift Command
- Built: 1971–1973
- In service: 1985–present
- Completed: 5
- Active: 5

General characteristics
- Type: Vehicle cargo ship
- Displacement: 13,220 long tons (13,432 t) light; 34,617 long tons (35,172 t) full
- Length: 681 ft (207.6 m)
- Beam: 97 ft (29.6 m)
- Draft: 37 ft (11.3 m)
- Propulsion: Diesel engines, single shaft
- Speed: 16.2 knots (30.0 km/h; 18.6 mph)
- Complement: 9 (Reduced Operational Status); 27 (Full Operational Status)

The Cape Ducato class are five roll-on/roll-off vehicle cargo ships of the United States Navy used to rapidly transport US military unit equipment such as tanks, helicopters, wheeled vehicles and other heavy equipment, to support deployed forces worldwide.

Built by Eriksbergs MV AB of Sweden and the Ateliers et Chantiers de France between 1971 and 1973, the ships served commercially before being purchased by the United States Maritime Administration (MARAD) in late 1985 from the Barber Steamship Company.

All five ships are currently berthed at Charleston, South Carolina as part of the Ready Reserve Force (RRF) in Reduced Operational Status "ROS-5", which allows for a transition to full operating status within five days under the Military Sealift Command.

== Ships ==
- MV Cape Ducato (T-AKR-5051). Laid down in 1972, as MV Barranduna by Eriksbergs MV, Sweden. Acquired by MARAD, 18 November 1985.
- MV Cape Douglas (T-AKR-5052). Laid down, c. 1972–1973, as MV Lalandia by Eriksbergs, Sweden. Purchased from Barber Steamship Co. by MARAD, 11 November 1985.
- MV Cape Domingo (T-AKR-5053). Laid down in 1971–1972, as MV Tarago by Ateliers et Chantiers de France. Purchased from Barber Steamship Co. by MARAD, 28 October 1985.
- MV Cape Decision (T-AKR-5054). Laid down in 1972 as MV Tombarra at Eriksbergs MV AB, Sweden. Purchased from Barber Steamship Co. by MARAD, 10 October 1985.
- MV Cape Diamond (T-AKR-5055). Laid down in 1972 as MV Tricolor by Ateliers et Chantiers de France. Purchased from Barber Steamship Co. by MARAD, 16 October 1985.

== Service history ==
In 1998, after Hurricane Mitch, Cape Ducato was one of several ships that transported construction materials to Nicaragua.

In March 2003 Cape Ducato and Cape Douglas were part of a six ship force ferrying part of the 4th Infantry Division to join the Iraq War.

All five ships of the class were activated in support of Operation Enduring Freedom.
