= SS Stella Solaris =

1952 French ocean liner

- Postcard of Stella Solaris sometime between 1971 and 2002, date and photographer unknown

History

France
- Name: Cambodge
- Namesake: Cambodia
- Owner: Louis Cruise Lines, Messageries Maritimes
- Builder: Societe des Ateliers & Chantiers, Dunkirk
- Yard number: 208
- Laid down: 28 June 1949
- Launched: 8 July 1952
- Completed: Summer 1953
- Maiden voyage: July 1953
- In service: July 1953
- Out of service: 1971
- Renamed: Stella V (1970)
- Identification: IMO number: 5059006
- Fate: Sold
- Notes: Requisitioned in 1962 as a troopship

Greece
- Name: Stella Solaris (1973-2003); S Solar (2003)
- Owner: Sun Lines
- In service: June 1973
- Out of service: 2002
- Identification: IMO number: 5059006
- Fate: Scrapped, 2003

General characteristics
- Type: Cruise ship
- Tonnage: 10,595 GRT (13,520 as Cambodge)
- Length: 545 ft (166 m)
- Beam: 72 ft (22 m)
- Decks: 9 (passenger accessible), formerly 7
- Installed power: Parsons geared turbines
- Propulsion: Twin screws
- Speed: 21 kn (38.89 km/h)
- Capacity: 765 as Stella Solaris 414 as Cambodge (1962 refit) 347 as Cambodge

SS Stella Solaris (lit. "Star of the Sun", formerly SS Cambodge) was an ocean liner built for Messageries Maritimes in 1953. She mainly provided passenger service between France, the Middle East, Southeast Asia, and Japan.

Stella Solaris was built in Dunkirk in northern France as Cambodge, and along with two sister ships, the SS Viet Nam and SS Laos (all three were nicknamed 'les blancs'/the 'whites' by their crews, because of their colour). She made her first voyage in 1953. After the 1970s, she was bought by a Greek company and converted into a cruise ship. Most of her working life was spent as a cruise ship in the Aegean Sea and she also made frequent transatlantic voyages to South America and the Caribbean Sea. Few major damaging incidents happened to Stella Solaris, and she quickly became one of the more popular cruise vessels of the time. An economic crisis in the cruise ship trade in 2003–2004 caused many older vessels, such as Stella Solaris, to be sold for scrap. After 54 years of service, she was retired in December 2003 and broken up in Alang, Bhavnagar District, India.

== Construction ==
The French shipping company Messageries Maritimes ordered three identical ships to be built around the late 1940s to provide passenger and mixed-freight service on a route between Marseilles and Yokohama via ports in South Asia. The first to be completed was Viet Nam in 1952, followed by Cambodge in 1953. Cambodge was built by Société des Ateliers & Chantiers in Dunkirk, Nord, in northern France. The name was derived from Cambodia. Her keel was laid down in 1949 and she was launched on 8 July 1952, then completed and delivered to Messageries Maritimes in July 1953. The third ship, Laos, was not completed until 1954.

Cambodge and her sisters were mid-sized liners. The ship was 13,520 GRT, 545 feet (166 m) long with a beam of 72 feet (22 m). She was powered by twin Parsons geared turbines, which gave her a cruising speed of 21 knots (39 km/h). Cambodge could carry 347 passengers on 7 decks — 117 in first class, 110 in second (tourist) class, and 120 in third (steerage or cabin) class. First class cabins occupied the majority of the passenger space in the central portion of the ship, the second class in the stern, and third class in the bow. First class passengers also had a large pool for their private use. A large amount of artistic flair was employed in the design of Cambodge. A French style predominated, but some Asian decorations were also incorporated. Italian artist Nino Zoncada was hired to design some of the interior of the ship.

== Layout as an ocean liner ==
Cambodge's first class dining room

F deck was the topmost deck, housing the ship's bridge. Berths for officers occupied most of this deck, but a children's playroom was in the aft starboard corner. The ship's lifeboats were also on this deck. E deck was the middle deck of the ship's superstructure. Most of E Deck consisted of first class cabins. The Drawing Room near the front had a row of windows said to "rival those of Atlantic liners of the time". Aft of the Drawing Room a first-class promenade surrounded nearly the entire interior of the deck. The Bar, Smoking Room and Writing Room were further astern, past the first class cabins. Aft of the public rooms were the outdoor first class swimming pool and lido deck area. The interior of D deck also primarily consisted of first class cabins, many with private balconies. Cabine de Luxe #5, with a separate bedroom and sitting room, was on the forward starboard portion of the deck and was the most luxuriant single berth on the ship. The back portion contained "studio" class cabins that were narrower and smaller than the other first class rooms. The deck also had the forecastle of the ship and the primary navigation equipment. Aft of the fo'c'sle was a third class outdoor area. Aft of the private balconies of the interior first class cabins was a second promenade deck.

C deck was the highest deck within the ship's hull. Third class cabins were in the starboard bow section, and the third class dining room was opposite of the cabins. After the third class area were more first-class cabins, terminating at a stair tower. Aft of the stairwell were second-class berths without private bath facilities, and aft of the second-class rooms was a sheltered promenade. B deck consisted mostly of public space. The first class and tourist class dining areas were both located amidships, separated by the ship's galley. The first class dining saloon was lit with fluorescent lights and equipped with apparatus to minimize sensation of the roll of the ship. The second-class dining area was similar to the first-class area, but not as lavish, and also doubled as the ship's cinema. The bow section of B Deck had more third-class accommodations and the third-class ship entrance. A deck had mostly crew's quarters, storage rooms, and had the ship's engines. There were also third class cabins in the bow. Notably, Cambodge's original steam turbine engine never suffered significant breakdowns and never had to be replaced.

== Layout as a cruise ship ==
The Sports deck (topmost) was mostly an outside recreation area. Two walkways in the aft section abutted the swimming pools on the deck below. The section closest to the bow lay atop the ship's bridge. Most of the sports deck was a spacious rooftop space. Lido deck constituted the pool area of the ship and also housed the bridge closer to the bow. There were two nearly oval-shaped swimming pools surrounded by a spacious lido area. Ahead of the lido section and behind the officers' quarters aft of the wheelhouse was a small buffet. The interior portion of the deck continued around the lido area via glass-enclosed walkways. These walkways were just inboard of the ship's lifeboats. Boat deck contained most of the first class cabins and there were 34 that were especially luxurious. The Card Room and Reading Room were aft of the passenger accommodations. A teak promenade encircled the entirety of Boat Deck, designed to slope towards its amidships section as a way to compensate for the swaying of the vessel.

Solaris deck consisted almost entirely of public spaces. The main dining room was located just aft of the ship's galley. The much smaller Bar Grill extended aft off the starboard side of the dining area. Amidships, the purser's office and ship's reception area were located in the primary entrance area of Stella Solaris. The Solaris Lounge and Piano Bar were located aft of the entrance hall, both used for various forms of entertainment. Golden deck was the lowest deck on the superstructure and was used for passenger accommodations. The ship's Beauty Parlor and hospital were directly aft of the cabins in the bow section, which contained the forecastle. Amidships were 16 "Deluxe Cabins". The aft of Golden Deck had the ship's gym and spa area, and the poop deck and fantail. Ruby deck, the highest deck in the ship's hull, also had passenger cabins and 16 Deluxe Cabins below those on Golden Deck. Emerald deck had further cabins and the main entrance area of the Stella Solaris. The entrance area had recessed circular lighting inspired by 1950s Italian ocean liners. Sapphire Deck had the lowest passenger cabins on the ship, divided into two portions. The ship's cinema was located in the back, as was the Discothèque, a public room located underneath the cinema.

== Career ==
Cambodge started her maiden voyage in July 1953. Her route linked Marseilles with various ports along the Suez Canal, Red Sea, Indian Ocean, South China Sea, and western Pacific Ocean. From Marseilles, she sailed across the Mediterranean Sea and through the Suez Canal and Red Sea to Port Said and Suez in Egypt, Aden in Yemen; Djibouti; across the Indian Ocean to Bombay, India; Colombo, Sri Lanka; and the island of Singapore; through the South China Sea to Saigon, Vietnam; Manila, Philippines; Hong Kong, and along the Pacific coast of Asia to finally reach Kobe and Yokohama in Japan. Along with Viet Nam and Laos, she sailed without major incident on this route until 1967, when the Six-Day War closed the Suez Canal.

In 1962, Cambodge took French troops from Algeria to France after the Algerian War, and was used as a hospital ship in the Vietnam War. With the ever-increasing popularity of air travel, she withdrew from regular passenger service and was rebuilt in 1962 to run cruises from Australian ports to destinations in the Indian Ocean. The vessels third class was replaced by space for an additional 214 tourist class passengers. On 13 July 1965, Cambodge was damaged after the vessel collided with the MV Kerbsia in Singapore, and was subsequently repaired in Keppel Harbour. In 1967, Messageries Maritimes renamed Viet-Nam as Pacifique, and in 1970 the company put all three ships up for sale. Cambodge's sister ships were bought by Compania Navegacion Abeto to carry Muslim pilgrims, and remodelled to carry over 1,600 passengers. Both were destroyed by fire in the mid-1970s. Cambodge, however, was bought by Sun Lines, a Greek cruise line, for conversion into a cruise ship.

In 1970 Cambodge sailed to La Spezia in northern Italy, where she was renamed Stella V and her interiors were partially gutted for a massive planned remodelling. When plans were completed, Stella V sailed to Perama, in southern Greece for conversion into Stella Solaris. Her passenger accommodations were revised to 765—all first class—and nearly twice the original capacity. Her gross register tonnage was reduced to 10,595 GRT. Her funnel was replaced with a more finned and streamlined one, her superstructure was terraced, lengthened and expanded, her cabins were fitted with air conditioning and private baths, and her pool and lido section was expanded and moved. Many of the French and Italian decorations were replaced with Greek-themed artwork, including ceramic, metal and velour features. Upon incorporation into Sun Lines' fleet, she was the largest vessel.

From then, Stella Solaris sailed the Aegean Sea and the eastern Mediterranean Sea during the summer, and operated cruise excursions in the Caribbean Sea and the South American Atlantic coast in the winter. Stella Solaris soon became one of the most popular cruise ships of the time. In 1982 she was featured in two episodes of The Love Boat on a Mediterranean cruise. She was featured on Cruise Travel magazine in July 1989 as "Ship of the Month", and was said to have a "repeat passenger ratio that was the envy of her competitors". In 1995, Sun and the rival Epirotiki Lines merged to form Royal Olympic Cruise Lines. Soon after, in 1998, Louis Cruise Lines, the final owner, bought most of the shares in Royal Olympic. Due to the Kosovo War the following year, Stella Solaris was temporarily laid up at Piraeus. In 2001 an accident damaged one of her propeller shafts, which was repaired soon after, but continued to cause problems.

== Fate ==
After the damage Stella Solaris suffered in 2001, she was planned for yet another remodelling and further cruise service. However, in the years following, modern cruise ships began to overtake older ships in popularity. Maintenance costs rose and Stella Solaris was taken out of service in 2002. Along with hundreds of other relatively old ocean liners, she was sold for scrap around late 2003. She sailed for Alang, Bhavnagar District, India under the delivery name S Solar, arriving on December 8, 2003, alongside another, smaller, Sun Lines ship, Stella Oceanis. Much of the artwork and furnishings from Stella Solaris was auctioned, some materials and fittings were also recovered and sold, while the rest of her hull was broken up and turned into scrap metal.

== Artworks ==
Stella Solaris was said to be "a ship of enormous quality and detail." Many historic artworks from the ship were auctioned off during the remodeling and after her destruction. This is a list of some of them:

- Works of La Fontaine, rendered by Camille Hillaire. (in Children's Playroom)
- Italian Comedy Figures, a series of murals by Jean Souverbie (in Drawing Room)
- Vases by Luc Lanel (in the Hall)
- Gardens and Chateaux of Ile de France by Camille Hillaire (in Writing Room)
- Pentecote de Honfleur by Hamburg (in Tourist Class Saloon)
- Naides reliefs by Guy Revol (in First Class Dining Saloon)
- Unnamed painting by Grau Sala, reminiscent of Paris, France (also in First Class Dining Saloon)
- Two interpretive paintings by Arthur Fages (Tourist Dining Saloon)

== See also ==
- Stella Polaris
- Stella Maris
- List of cruise ships
- List of ocean liners
