= Ateliers et Chantiers de France =

Former shipyard in Dunkirk, France

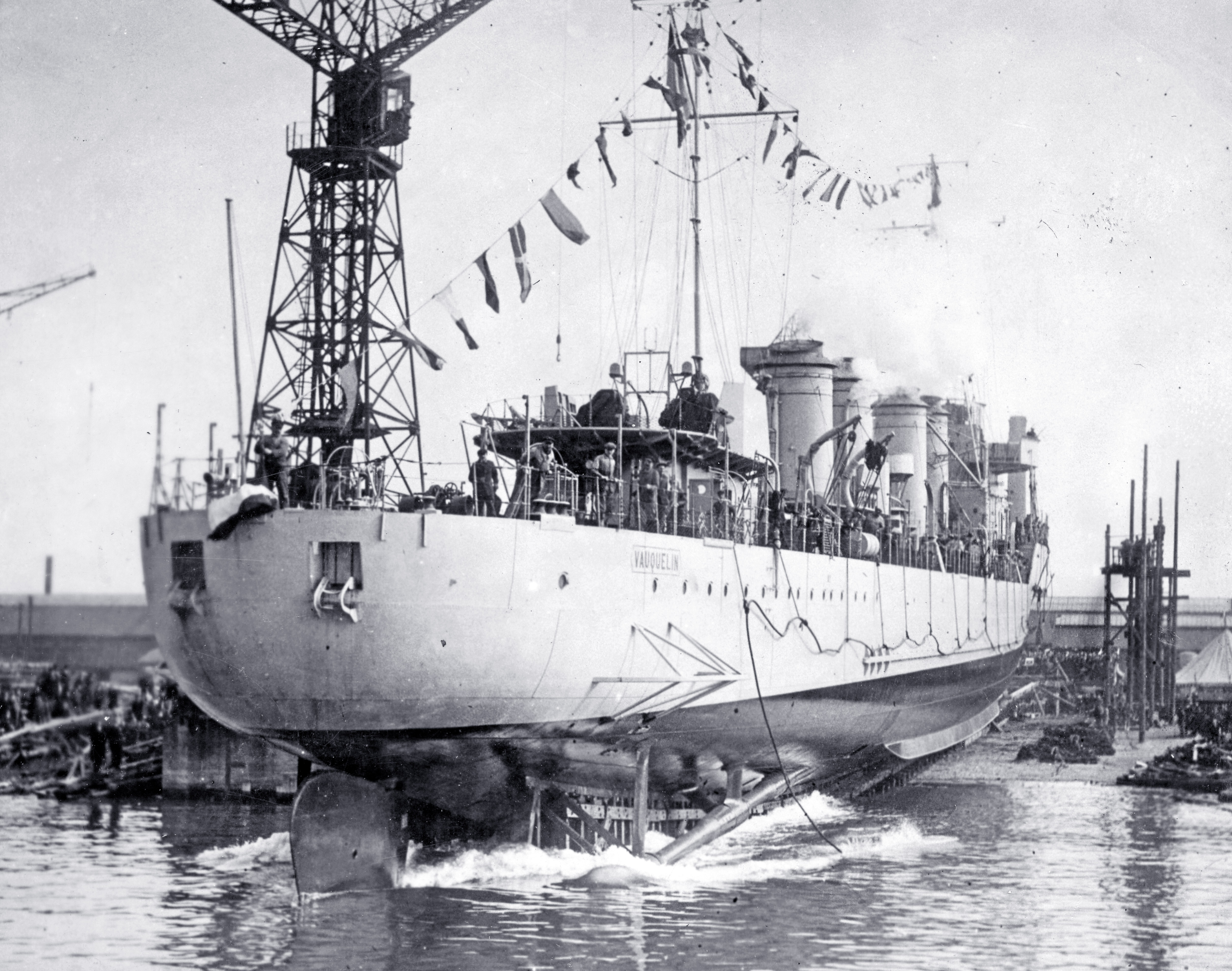
- The French destroyer Vauquelin sliding down the ways on 29 March 1931
- Industry: Shipbuilding
- Founded: July 6, 1898 in Dunkirk, France
- Defunct: 1987
- Headquarters: Dunkirk, France

Location in France 51.047762°N 2.375219°E

The Ateliers et Chantiers de France (ACF, Workshops and Shipyards of France) was a major shipyard that was established in Dunkirk, France, in 1898. The shipyard boomed in the period before World War I (1914–18), but struggled in the inter-war period. It was badly damaged during World War II (1939–45). In the first thirty years after the war the shipyard again experienced a boom and employed up to 3,000 workers making oil tankers, and then liquid natural gas tankers. Demand dropped off in the 1970s and 1980s. In 1972 the shipyard became Chantiers de France-Dunkerque, and in 1983 merged with others yards to become part of Chantiers du Nord et de la Mediterranee, or Normed. The shipyard closed in 1987.

== Foundation (1898–99) ==
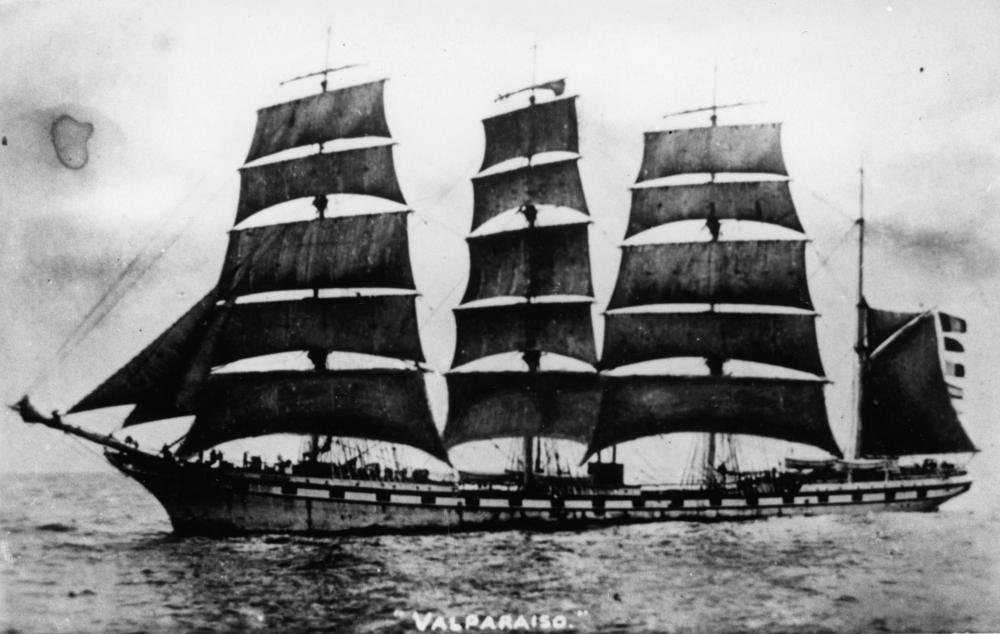
Valparaiso, a four-masted steel barque built in 1902 by Chantiers de France

The Ateliers et Chantiers de France (ACF) company was officially founded on 6 July 1898 by a consortium of six shipping brokers, the Dunkirk chamber of commerce and the state. The state asked that the shipyard be able to build steamships and also four-masted barques and clippers with metal hulls. The state ceded the public land within the fortifications of Dunkirk to the east of the channel, and undertook levelling of the site and excavation of a launching basin. The work proceeded smoothly. Six slipways were built on a site of 11 hectares (27 acres) to the east of the city. The new facility was the first in France to power its machinery with electricity.

== Pre-war (1899–1914) ==
The ACF was successful in its first few years. One of the first directors was Florent Guillain. The first ship was the Adolphe III, launched on 22 March 1902. This was a four-master with a riveted hull intended for the Atlantic trade. By this time the shipyard had 800–900 workers, including some from Saint-Nazaire and some from across the border in Belgium. Apprentices were recruited for training at the age of 12. The shipyard was busy in the period before World War I (1914–18) building trawlers, cargo chips and cruise boats. The workforce rose to almost 1,900. The first of ten passenger liners was the Asie, launched on 10 February 1914.

== World War I (1914–18) ==
The ACF was less active during World War I since over 60% of the workers had been mobilized in the armed forces. The shipyard concentrated on repair and renovation of warships and manufacture of weapons and ammunition. In 1914 the Forges at Chantiers de France fitted armor on three cars at the request of a Royal Naval Air Service squadron in Dunkirk. One of these, a 50 hp Rolls-Royce, was thus the first Rolls-Royce armored car. The armor was 6mm boiler plate, so could only protect against a rifle bullet from a distance of 600 yards (550 m) or more.

== Inter-war period (1918–39) ==
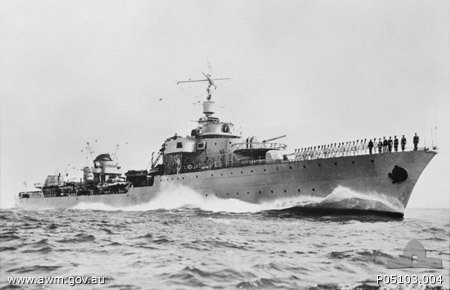
Le Triomphant launched in 1934

The 1920s were a difficult period, with only a slight improvement in the 1930s. In 1924 the shipyard joined forces with the Société des Forges & Chantiers de la Méditerranée and the Société des Ateliers et Chantiers de St Nazaire to submit a joint bid to build submarines for Poland. They submitted a low bid, but due to lack of experience were not selected. The ACF struggled against competition from other yards in France and abroad, and was affected by the depressed economy of the 1930s. It was able to obtain orders from the Compagnie Générale Transatlantique and from the Dreyfus arms manufacturer. Naval orders were important, including the destroyers Bourrasque, Adroit, Le Triomphant, Lion and Vauban as well as minesweepers and tankers. The Émile-Miguet, launched in 1937, was the largest tanker in the world in its day. The motor tanker of 14,115 tons, built for the Compagnie Navale des Petroles, was sunk on 12 October 1939 by gunfire from German submarine U-48.

== World War II (1939–45) ==
During World War II (1939–45) the shipyard was destroyed in 1940, rebuilt during the German occupation of France, then destroyed again.

== Post-war boom (1945–77) ==
The ACF was rebuilt in 1947. The shipyard could accommodate ships of 210 metres (690 ft) length and 4,000 tonnes deadweight. The shipyard experienced a boom for the next thirty years. During this period the original quay was rebuilt and a second quay added. The workshops were modernized to support welding and prefabrication. The shipyard received financial support from the state, which became its largest creditor. On 15 October 1949 the AP2 workshop was opened, nicknamed "The Cathedral" for its size: 75 by 24 metres (246 by 79 ft) with a height of 30 metres (98 ft). The AP2 contained two 30-ton cranes to handle prefabricated welded hull components.

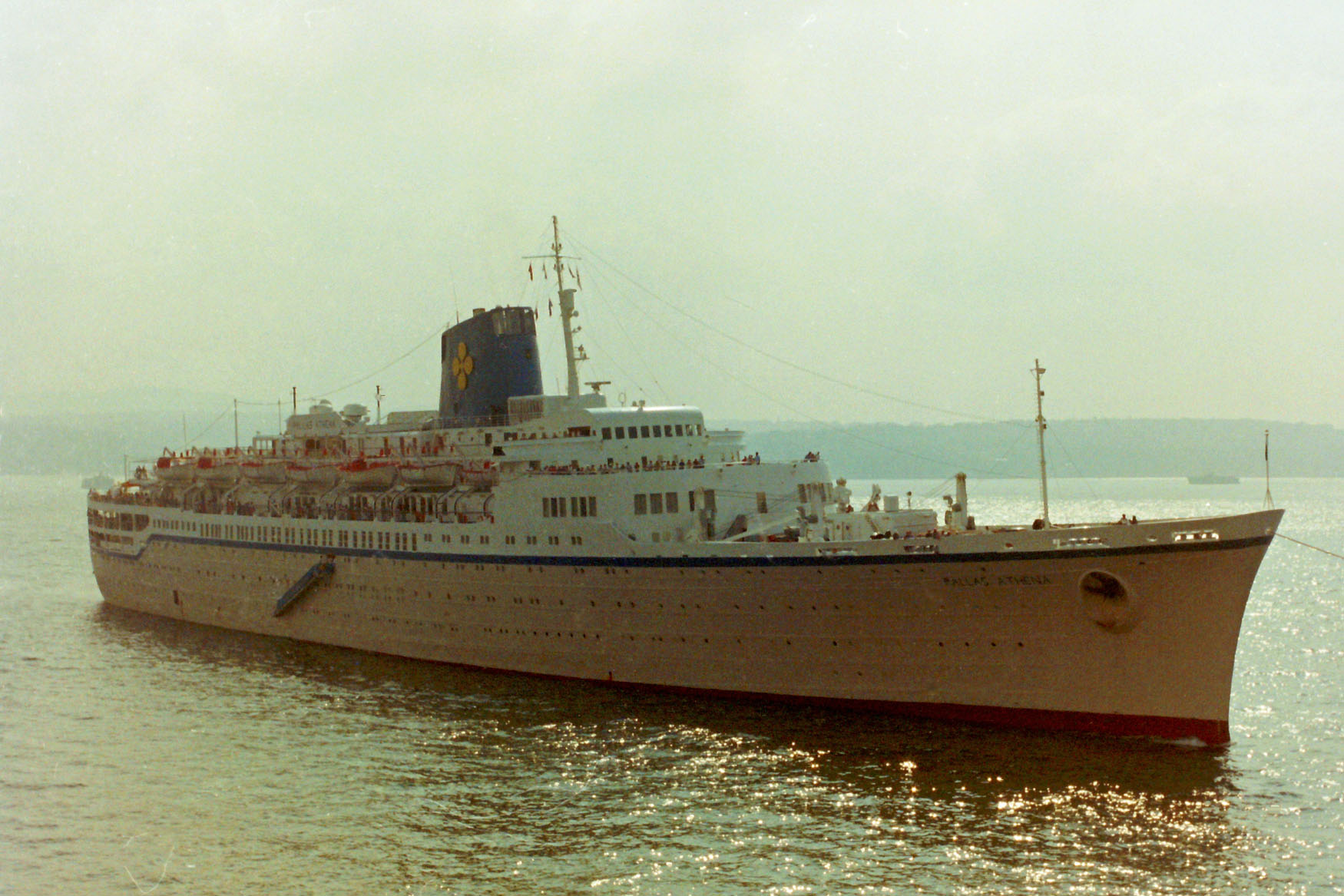
Former SS Flandre (launched 1951) in service as Pallas Athena

The ACF employed about 3,000 people in 1950. In 1948–52 the shipyard built the liners Flandre, Calédonien and Cambodge for the Compagnie des Messageries Maritimes. It moved into construction of large oil tankers, as well as bulk carriers of ore and other products. Tankers of 34,000 tonnes were built for an American oil company. In 1960 the Schneider group took a major stake in the enterprise, and in following years rationalized production in Dunkirk with operations at other sites.

On 30 November 1960 the yard became part of the Ateliers et Chantiers de Dunkerque-Bordeaux (ACDB). Almost all the investment by Schneider and the state went into the Dunkirk operation rather than Bordeaux.

The shipyard started making specialized vessels including "ship garages" or rouliers, refrigerated ships and liquefied natural gas (LNG) carriers. The last passenger liner, the Pasteur, was launched on 2 June 1966. At the end of 1967 Schneider split up the ACDB. In 1972 the yard became Chantiers de France-Dunkerque. In 1974–81 the shipyard employed 3,000 workers and staff to design and build seven 130,000 cubic metres (4,600,000 cu ft) LNG carriers.

== Last years (1977–88) ==
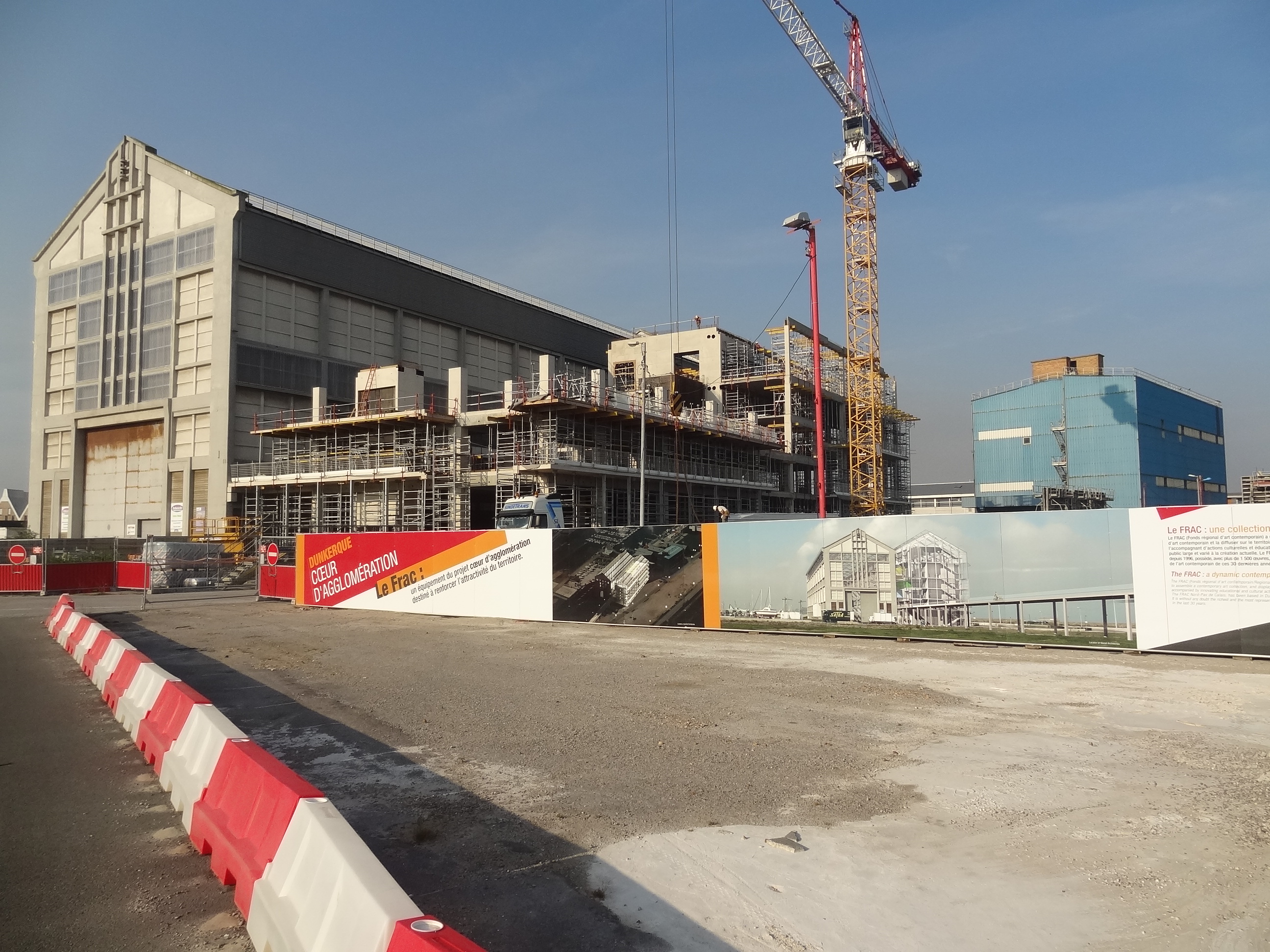
FRAC building under construction beside the AP2 (left)

In September 1977 as part of a government rescue package the shipyard merged with the Société métallurgique et navale (SMN) to become the shipping branch of the Société métallurgique et navale Dunkerque-Normandie (SMNDN), a subsidiary of the Empain-Schneider group. That year it was forced to lay off workers due to the petrol crisis. Activity declined further in the 1980s, although two car ferries were built for Stena Line. In 1983 the shipyard merged with La Ciotat and La Seyne-sur-Mer to form Normed. In 1986 1,500 employees were put on leave, and "early retirement" was set at three years. On 15 April 1987 the train ferry Nord-Pas-de-Calais was launched. It finally left the shipyard on 15 January 1988. The remaining assets were sold at auction, and by 1989 all the cranes had been removed.

The Fonds régionaux d’art contemporain (Frac) Nord-Pas de Calais, a center for international contemporary art, is located in a new building erected beside the AP2, which still stands as a monument to the shipbuilding era.

== Notable ships ==
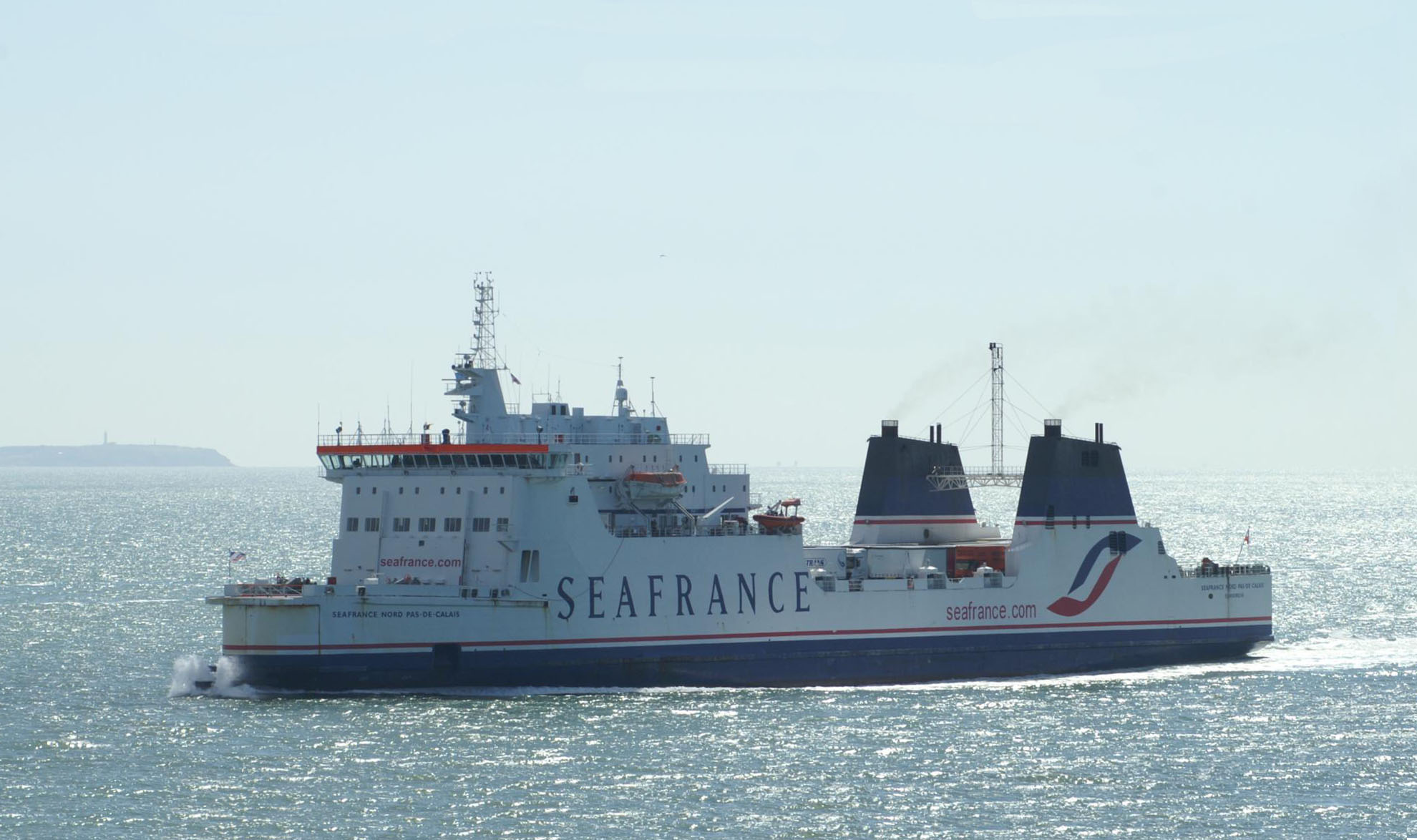
Nord-Pas-de-Calais, launched 1987

- Destroyer Bourrasque. Launched, 5 August 1925; sunk, 30 May 1940
- Destroyer L'Adroit. Launched, 1 April 1927; sunk, 25 May 1940
- Destroyer Le Triomphant. Launched, 16 April 1934; decommissioned, 6 December 1954
- Destroyer Lion. Scuttled, 27 November, 1942
- Destroyer Vauban. Scuttled, 27 November 1942
- Cape Ducato-class vehicle cargo ships
- Adolphe. Launched, 23 March 1902; wrecked on 30 September 1904
- SS Jacques Cartier, later named SS Winnipeg. Completed, 1918; torpedoed and sunk, 22 October 1942
- SS Athos. In service, 28 November 1915; torpedoed and sunk, 17 February 1917
- SS Cambodge, later named SS Stella Solaris. Launched, 28 June 1949; out of service, 1971
- SS Viet-Nam. Launched, 14 October 1951; destroyed by fire, 12 May 1974
- SS Flandre. Launched, 31 October 1951; destroyed by fire, 23 March 1994
- MS Pride of Telemark. Launched, 1983
- MS Stena Danica - Launched in 1983
- MS Nord Pas-de-Calais. Launched, 1987

== Sources ==
- Allen Tony (2007-02-26). "MV Emile Miguet [+1939]". Wrecksite.
- Cassis, Youssef (1997-06-26), Big Business : The European Experience in the Twentieth Century: The European Experience in the Twentieth Century, Oxford University Press, UK, ISBN 978-0-19-152179-9
- Daley, Anthony (1996-02-15), Steel, State, and Labor: Mobilization and Adjustment in France, University of Pittsburgh Pre, ISBN 978-0-8229-7485-7
- Fletcher, David (2012-04-20), The Rolls-Royce Armoured Car, Osprey Publishing, ISBN 978-1-78096-402-7
- Oddone, Patrick (2015). "Le FRAC au Grand Large, mémoire pour le futur" (in French). Communauté urbaine de Dunkerque.
- Perpillou, Aimé; Fernandez, Alexandre (2007), Les constructions navales dans l'histoire (in French), Presses Paris Sorbonne, ISBN 978-2-84050-509-9
- "Référence Mérimée IA00123272". Mérimée (in French).
- Richard, Damien (2006), L'épreuve de la modernité. Histoire des Ateliers et Chantiers de France, à Dunkerque(1945-1973) (Thesis) (in French), École nationale des chartes
- Stoker, Donald J. (2003), Britain, France, and the Naval Arms Trade in the Baltic, 1919-1939: Grand Strategy and Failure, Psychology Press, ISBN 978-0-7146-5319-8
- Tartart, Olivier (2008-08-16), "Grandeur et décadence des Chantiers de France", La Voix du Nord (in French)
- "What is Frac Nord-Pas de Calais?". Frac Nord-Pas de Calais?.
