= Queen of the Pacific =

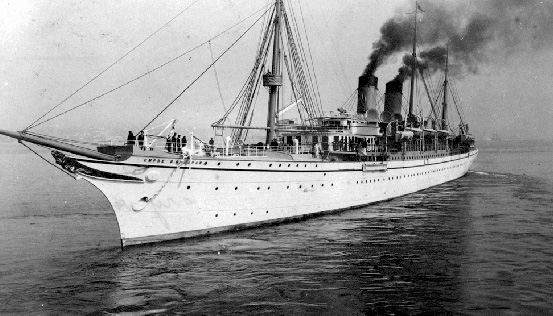
Canadian Pacific Steamship Co's RMS Empress of Japan (1891)

Queen of the Pacific is a name or nickname of ships and places associated with the Pacific Ocean, the largest of Earth's oceans.

== Ships ==
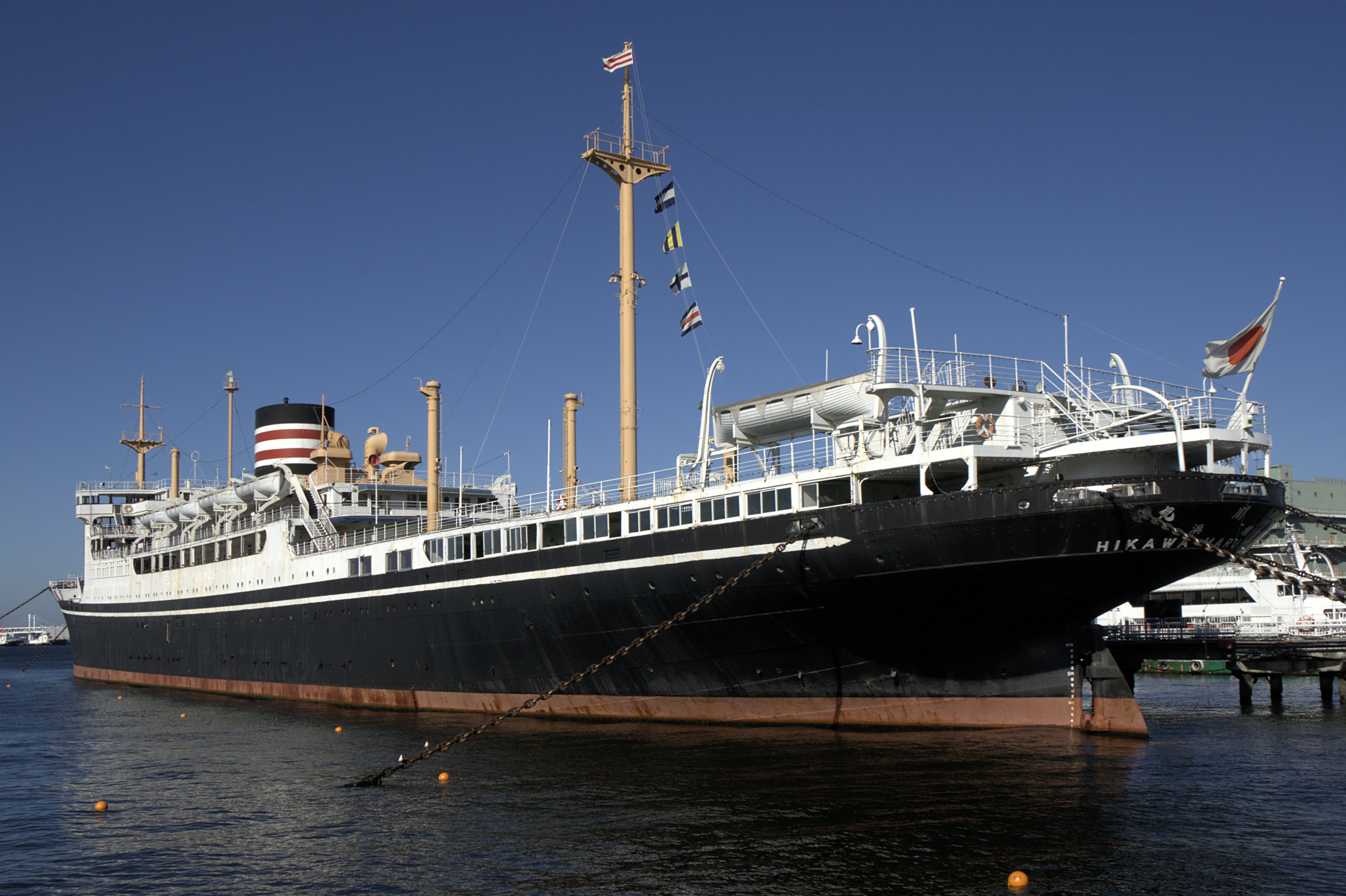
NYK Line's Hikawa Maru preserved at Naka-ku, Yokohama

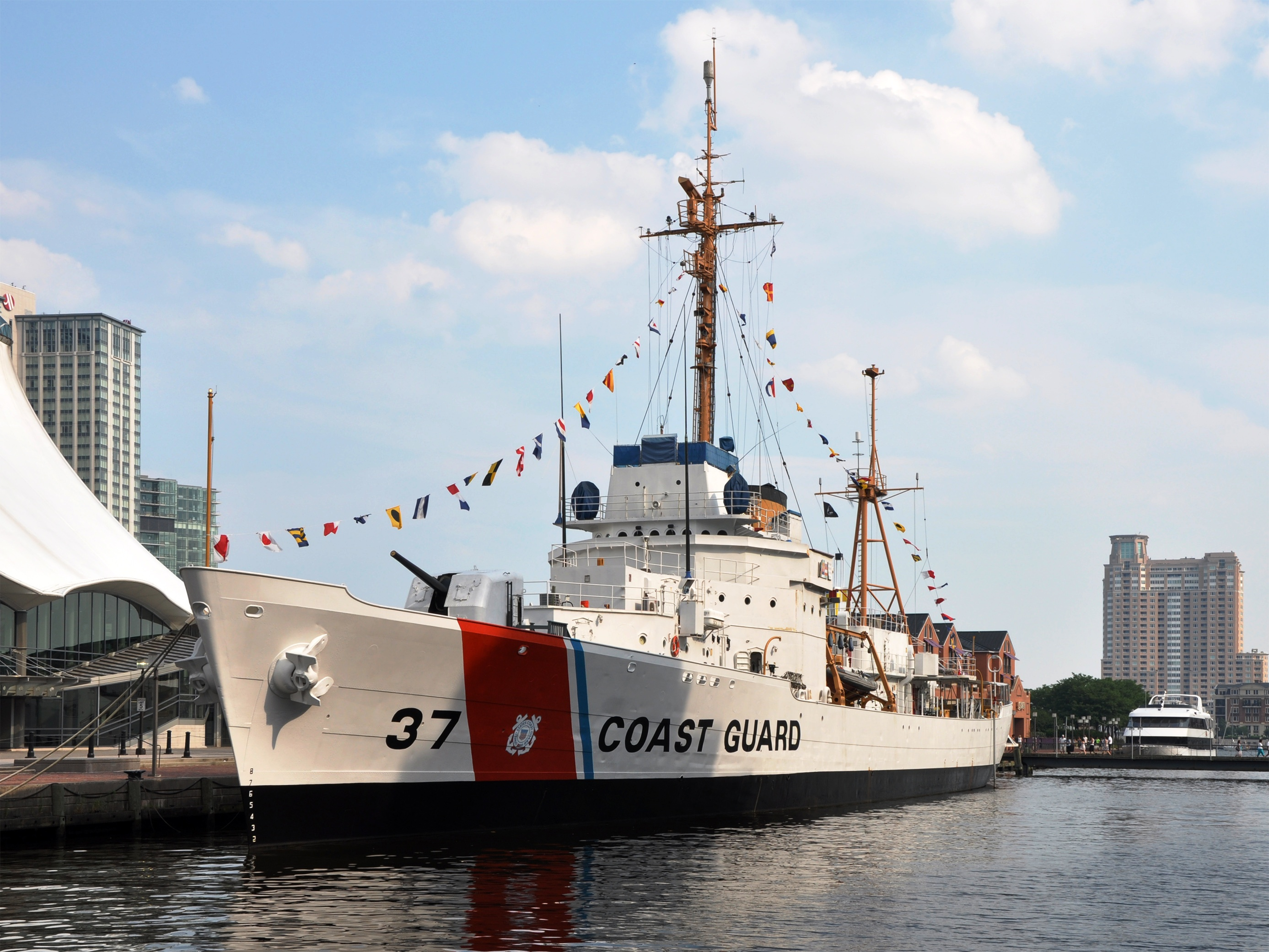
US Coast Guard Cutter USCGC Taney preserved in Baltimore Inner Harbor

- In 1852, at the height of the age of the fast clipper sailing ships, the clipper Queen of the Pacific was launched from Pembroke, Maine.
- In 1857 the 2,801-ton wooden-hulled side-wheel steamship Queen of the Pacific was built and launched for the San Francisco – Nicaragua line of the Morgan and Garrison partnership. By 1859 Cornelius Vanderbilt owned her and renamed her SS Ocean Queen for transatlantic service. She was subsequently owned and operated by the Quartermaster's Department of the United States Department of War, the New York City – Aspinwall service, the Pacific Mail Steamship Company and Ruger Brothers before being broken up in 1874.
- In 1888 the loss of a Queen of the Pacific in what was then called Port Harford (later renamed Port San Luis) brought forward the installation of the much needed Point San Luis Light in San Luis Obispo County, California. The U.S. Supreme Court ruled in 1901 on liability for damage to that ship's cargo.
- In 1891 the new 5,905-ton twin-funnel steam ocean liner RMS Empress of Japan was hailed as the Queen of the Pacific when Canadian Pacific Steamships commissioned her for the trans-Pacific service. Her figurehead is preserved in Vancouver Maritime Museum and there is a fiberglass replica of the figurehead in Vancouver's Stanley Park.
- Hikawa Maru, an 11,602-ton NYK Line liner built in 1929, was nicknamed the Queen of the Pacific by its passengers. One of only two Imperial Japanese ocean-going passenger liners to survive World War II, she retired from service in 1960 and is permanently berthed at Yamashita Park in Naka-ku, Yokohama, Japan since 1961.
- Reina del Pacifico is Spanish for "Queen of the Pacific", and was the name of a British 17,702-ton Pacific Steam Navigation Company liner built in 1930. In her time she was the largest ocean liner serving the west coast of South America.
- The United States Coast Guard Cutter USCGC Taney was nicknamed the Queen of the Pacific while serving as the unofficial flagship of the Coast Guard's Pacific Area commander in the late 1960s and early 1970s. Taney is preserved by Baltimore Maritime Museum in Baltimore Inner Harbor. Her cruise books are in the collection of the Coast Guard Cutter Cruise Book Preservation Center.

== Places ==
=== Countries ===
- Philippines: in André de la Varre's 1938 documentary film "Manila, Queen of the Pacific".
- Tahiti: the "Queen of the Pacific" in Jules Verne's Twenty Thousand Leagues Under the Seas and in Francis Allyn Olmsted's Incidents of a Whaling Voyage.

=== States ===
- California: "the youthful Queen of the Pacific, in her robes of freedom, gorgeously inlaid with gold," in a speech by William H. Seward to the United States Senate in 1850.

=== Cities ===
- Acapulco, Mexico
- Honolulu, Hawaii
- Old Panama City: called the Queen of the Pacific before pirate Henry Morgan burned it.
- San Francisco

== People ==
- Sandra Ávila Beltrán, a Mexican drug lord
