= List of ocean liners =

This is a list of ocean liners past and present, which are passenger ships engaged in the transportation of passengers and goods in transoceanic voyages. Ships primarily designed for pleasure cruises are listed at List of cruise ships. Some ships which have been explicitly designed for both line voyages and cruises, or which have been converted from liners to cruise ships, may be listed in both places. Also included are cargo liners designed to carry both cargo and passengers.

== Legend ==
- Preserved and/or laid up ships
- Ships in service

== Single name ==
The following ships were not renamed at any time during their career.

Ship name	Year launched	Fate	Image
SS Abyssinia	1870	Caught fire, and sank on December 18, 1891	SS Abyssinia (1870)
RMS Acadia	1840	Scrapped in 1858 after being deployed as a troopship during the Indian Mutiny	
USAHS Acadia	1932	Scrapped in 1955	S. S. Acadia
SS Adolphine	1860	Unknown	
SS Adriatic	1871	Scrapped in 1899 after being sold	Steamship Adriatic
SS Adriatic (1856)	1856	Beached and abandoned in 1885	SS Adriatic
RMS Adriatic	1906	Scrapped in 1935	SS Adriatic in Belfast
SS Afric	1898	Torpedoed and sunk by SM UC-66, February 12, 1917.	SS Afric
RMS Africa	1850	Sold for refit as a sailing ship in 1868	
RMS Alaunia	1913	Sunk after striking a sea mine on 19 October 1916 off Eastbourne, East Sussex	RMS Alaunia
RMS Alaunia	1925	Scrapped in 1957	RMS Alaunia
RMS Alcantara	1913	Attacked by German merchant raiders, and sank on February 29, 1916	Alcantara
SS Algonquin	1926	Scrapped in 1957	
RMS Amazon	1906	Torpedoed and sunk March 15, 1918	Amazon and Aragon. Amazon is on the bottom.
RMS America	1847	Broken up in 1875	RMS America arrives in Halifax, 1859
RMS Andania	1913	Sunk by a torpedo, 27 January 1918	Andania in Scott's Yard alongside HMS Ajax
RMS Andania	1922	Sunk by a torpedo, 16 June 1940	RMS Andania
SS Andrea Doria	1951	Collided with MS Stockholm, and sank on July 26, 1956.	SS Andrea Doria
SS Aorangi (1883)	1883	Scrapped in 1925	Aorangi
MV Aorangi (1924)	1924	Scrapped in 1953	Aorangi II
SS Antilles	1953	Caught fire, and abandoned after hitting a reef on January 8, 1971	Antilles
RMS Aquitania	1913	Scrapped in 1950	RMS Aquitania
SS Arabic	1902	Torpedoed and sunk by SM U-24 on August 19, 1915	Arabic
HMT Aragon	1905	Sunk by torpedo on 30 December 1917	SS Aragon
SS Arandora Star	1927	Torpedoed and sunk on July 2, 1940	Arandora Star as a troop ship in 1940
SS Arcadia	1953	Scrapped at Kaohsiung, Taiwan in 1979	SS Arcadia in Aden
SS Arctic	1850	Collided with SS Vesta, and sank in 1854	Arctic
RMS Arlanza	1911	Scrapped in 1938	Arlanza
SS Armadale Castle	1903	Scrapped in 1936	RMS Armadale Castle
SS Armenian	1895	Torpedoed and Sunk by SM U-24 on June 28, 1915	SS Armenian
RMS Arundel Castle	1919	Scrapped in 1959	SS Arundel Castle
Asama Maru	1928	Torpedoed and sunk on November 1, 1944	MV Asama Maru in 1936
RMS Ascania (1923)	1925	Scrapped in 1956	RMS Ascania at pier 90 in New York.
RMS Asia	1850	Broken up in 1883	RMS Asia
SS Athenia	1923	Torpedoed and sunk, September 3, 1939	Athenia
MV Athlone Castle	1936	Scrapped at Kaohsiung, Taiwan in 1965	Athlone Castle
SS Atlantic (1849)	1849	Scrapped in 1871.	Atlantic
RMS Atlantic	1871	Ran aground and wrecked off Nova Scotia, April 1, 1873	Wreck of the Atlantic
RMS Aurania (1882)	1882	Scrapped in 1905	Aurania
RMS Aurania (1916)	1916	Torpedoed, then wrecked in tow, 4 February 1918	Aurania II
RMS Ausonia	1922	Scrapped in 1965	Ausonia anchored at Liverpool in 1947
Awa Maru	1899	Taken out of service in 1930, fate unknown	
MV Awa Maru	1942	Torpedoed and sunk on May 1, 1945	
HMT Awatea	1936	Bombed and Sunk by German Aircraft, November 11, 1942	Profile of the TSS Awatea, 1936–1942
RMS Balmoral Castle	1910	Scrapped in 1939	RMS Balmoral Castle
SS Baltic	1850	Scrapped in 1880	SS Baltic
RMS Baltic	1903	Scrapped in 1933 – Japan	Baltic
MS Batory	1935	Scrapped in 1971	MS Batory
SS Belgravia	1881	Ran aground and wrecked May 22, 1896	
SS Bothnia	1874	Scrapped in 1899	Poster image of SS Bothnia
SS Braemar Castle	1898	Scrapped in 1924	Braemar Castle as a hospital ship
SS Bremen	1928	Caught fire, and gutted in 1941. Later scrapped in 1946	TS Bremen
SS Britannic	1874	Scrapped in 1903 after being sold	SS Britannic
HMHS Britannic	1914	Sank after striking a mine in 1916.	H.M.H.S. Britannic.
MV Britannic	1929	Scrapped in 1960	MV Britannic
RMS Caledonia	1840	Lost outside Havana in 1851	
SS Caledonia	1904	Torpedoed by SM U-24 on December 4, 1916	Caledonia in 1915.
HMS Calgarian	1913	Torpedoed and sunk on March 1, 1918	HMS Calgarian
SS California	1906	Torpedoed by SM U-85 on February 7, 1917	SS California in 1911.
SS California	1923	Crippled by a German air attack on July 11, 1943, and sunk the next day by the Royal Navy	SS California (1923)
RMS Cambria	1844	Scrapped in March 1875 after being sold	
SS Cameronia	1911	Torpedoed by the German submarine SM U-33 on April 15, 1917	SS Cameronia in 1911
RMS Campania	1892	Collided with HMS Glorious, and sank on November 5, 1918	Campania
RMS Canada	1848	Scrapped in 1883	
SS Canberra	1960	Scrapped at Gadani Beach, Pakistan in 1997	Canberra in Sydney, Australia in 1974
SS Cap Arcona	1927	Caught fire and capsized in the Bay of Lübeck after being bombed by British aircraft on May 3, 1945. Wreck scrapped in 1949.	Cap Arcona
MV Capetown Castle	1937	Scrapped at La Spezia, Italy in 1967	Postcard of RMMV Capetown Castle
SMS Cap Trafalgar	1913	Sank in combat on September 14, 1914	Cap Trafalgar in Trinidad
RMS Carinthia	1925	Torpedoed and sunk by U-46 on June 7, 1940	RMS Carinthia
RMS Carmania	1905	Scrapped in 1932	RMS Carmania
MV Carnarvon Castle	1926	Scrapped at Mihara, Japan in 1963	Carnarvon Castle, after her 1938 refit
SS Carondelet	1877	Unknown	
RMS Caronia	1904	Scrapped in 1933	RMS Caronia
RMS Carpathia	1902	Torpedoed southeast of Ireland and west of the Scilly Isles by SM U-55 on July 17, 1918	RMS Carpathia under way
RMS Carthage	1931	Scrapped in 1961	RMS Carthage
SS Catalonia	1881	Scrapped in 1901	SS Catalonia
SS Cathay	1924	Bombed by German aircraft, sank in 1942	Cathay in Sydney Harbour
RMS Cedric	1902	Scrapped in 1932	RMS Cedric
RMS Celtic	1901	Ran aground on 10 December 1928, scrapped on site	RMS Celtic in 1905
SS Ceramic	1912	Torpedoed and sunk on December 6, 1942	SS Ceramic at sea
SS Champlain	1931	Struck an air-laid mine and capsized off of La Pallice, France on June 17, 1940, later torpedoed. Wreck scrapped in 1965.	SS Champlain in dock
SS Champollion	1925	Wrecked near Beirut, 22 December 1952, scrapped on site.	SS Champollion
SS Cheribon	1882	Wrecked on April 11, 1902, at Remedios Point, Panama	SS Cheribon
MS Chrobry	1939	Scuttled in 1940 by British torpedo after being damaged by German aircraft	MS Chrobry
SS Chusan	1949	Scrapped at Kaohsiung, Taiwan in 1973, work completed in 1974.	SS Chusan in Singapore, 1969
SS City of Adelaide	1863	Ran aground in 1916	City of Adelaide in 1890–1902.
SS City of Benares	1936	Torpedoed and sunk on September 17, 1940, while carrying child evacuees	
SS City of Boston	1864	Vanished and presumed lost January 1870	City of Boston
SS City of Brussels	1869	Collided with SS Kirby Hall while entering the River Mersey, and sank on January 7, 1883	City of Brussels
SS City of Cairo	1915	Torpedoed and sunk on November 6, 1942	
SS City of Columbus	1878	Wrecked off Martha's Vineyard January 18, 1884	City of Columbus, with the schooner Dexter
SS City of Glasgow	1850	Vanished and presumed lost in 1854	The City Of Glasgow in a lithograph by Edward Duncan
SS City of London	1863	Vanished and presumed lost in 1881	
SS City of Manchester	1851	Wrecked in 1876	
SS City of Nagpur	1922	Torpedoed and sunk on April 29, 1941	City of Nagpur
SS City of New York	1888	Scrapped in 1923 – Genoa, Italy	City of New York
SS City of Paris	1920	Scrapped in 1956	
SS City of Peking	1874	Scrapped in 1920	City of Peking
City of Philadelphia	1854	Sank on maiden voyage off Cape Race September 9, 1854	
SS City of Richmond	1873	Scrapped in 1896 – Genoa, Italy	
SS City of Rio de Janeiro	1878	Struck rocks and sank on February 22, 1901, off of San Francisco	City of Rio de Janeiro in 1898
SS City of Rome	1881	Scrapped in 1902 – Germany	RMS City of Rome
SS City of Tokio	1874	Wrecked off Tokyo Bay, June 1885	City of Tokyo, departing Japan
RMS Columbia (1840)	1840	Wrecked on Devil's Limb Reef at Seal Island, Nova Scotia, on July 2, 1843	
SS Conte di Savoia	1931	Scrapped in 1950	
SS Conte Rosso	1921	Torpedoed and sunk, 24 May 1941	
SS Conte Verde	1922	Scrapped in 1949	
RMS Corfu	1931	Scrapped in 1961	RMS Corfu in 1932
SS Cristoforo Colombo	1953	Scrapped in 1982 at Kaohsiung, Taiwan	
SS Dakota	1904	Struck a reef and sank off Yokohama on March 3, 1907	The S.S. Dakota
SS Deutschland	1923	Bombed by British aircraft, and sank on May 3, 1945	S.S. Deutschland being towed.
SS Delphic	1922	Torpedoed and sunk, August 16, 1917	S.S. Delphic in Wellington
SS Devonian (1900)	1900	Torpedoed and sunk, August 21, 1917	The S.S. Devonian in port.
RMS Doric	1922	Scrapped in 1935	R.M.S. Doric in 1923
SS Dover Castle	1904	Torpedoed and sunk by UC-67 on May 26, 1918	
RMS Duchess of Atholl	1928	Torpedoed and sunk by U-178 on October 10, 1942.	RMS Duchess of Atholl
SS Duchess of York	1928	Crippled by a German air attack on July 11, 1943, and sunk the next day by the Royal Navy	A postcard of the S.S. Duchess of York
SS Duilio	1923	Bombed by Allied aircraft and sank in 1944	S.S. Duilio at sea.
MV Durban Castle	1938	Scrapped at Hamburg in 1962	
SS Edinburgh Castle	1910	Sunk as a target near Sierra Leone on September 25, 1945	The Edinburgh Castle at port.
RMS Edinburgh Castle	1947	Scrapped 1976	The Edinburgh Castle at sea.
SS Elbe	1881	Collided with SS Crathie, and sank in the North Sea on January 31, 1895	SS Elbe in 1881
RMS Empress of Asia	1912	Bombed by Japanese aircraft and sank off Sultan Shoal on February 5, 1942	R.M.S. Empress of Asia leaving Vancouver in 1917
RMS Empress of Britain	1930	Torpedoed and sunk on October 28, 1940, by a German U-boat	R.M.S. Empress of Britain in 1931.
RMS Empress of Canada	1920	Torpedoed and sunk in 1943 by the Italian submarine Leonardo da Vinci	R.M.S. Empress of Canada docked at Vancouver in June 1936
RMS Empress of China	1890	Scrapped in 1912 – Yokohama, Japan	R.M.S. Empress of China docked at Vancouver in 1893
RMS Empress of Ireland	1906	Collided with SS Storstad, and sank on May 29, 1914	R.M.S. Empress of Ireland
RMS Empress of Japan	1890	Scrapped in 1926	R.M.S. Empress of Japan in 1894
RMS Empress of Russia	1912	Scrapped in 1945 – Barrow-in-Furness	RMS Empress of Russia coaling at Vancouver circa 1930
SS Espagne	1909	Scrapped in 1934	S.S. Espagne at the port of Saint-Nazaire
RMS Etruria	1884	Scrapped in 1910	RMS Etruria in the River Mersey
RMS Europa	1847	Sold in February 1866	R.M.S. Europa in 1848
SS Finland	1902	Scrapped in 1928	S.S. Finland in the city of New York, 1906 USS Finland in the port of Newport News with returning troops, circa 1919.
SS Flandre	1913	Sunk by a mine, 1940.	S.S. Flandre
SS France	1910	Scrapped in 1936	S.S. France in 1912
RMS Franconia	1910	Torpedoed and sunk, October 4, 1916	RMS Franconia in Boston
RMS Franconia	1923	Scrapped in 1956	RMS Franconia in Sydney
MV Funchal	1961	To be scrapped in Aliağa, Turkey	Funchal in Helsinki, 2009
SS Gallia	1913	Torpedoed and sunk, October 4, 1916	S.S. Gallia in 1913
MS Georges Philippar	1930	Caught fire, and sank on May 19, 1932	Georges Philippar in 1931.
SS Geelong	1904	Torpedoed and sunk, January 1, 1916	S.S. Geelong
MV Georgic	1931	Bombed in July 1941, refloated, scrapped in 1956	Postcard of M.V. Georgic MV Georgic as a troop ship in 1944. MV Georgic in Australia, 1949. Note the singular funnel.
MS Giulio Cesare	1950	Scrapped at La Spezia, Italy in 1973	MS Giulio Cesare
SS Gneisenau	1935	Sunk 2 May 1943, refloated on 12 July 1950 and scrapped	S.S. Gneisenau on the river Scheldt.
SS Gothic	1947	Scrapped in 1969	The Royal Yacht Gothic in 1954
SS Great Britain	1843	Preserved as a museum ship	Great Britain in Bristol
SS Great Eastern	1858	Scrapped in 1889	S.S. Great Eastern in dock. Great Eastern, pictured with 4 funnels.
SS Great Western	1837	Scrapped in 1856	The Great Western riding a tidal wave, painted 11 December 1844
Hikawa Maru	1929	Preserved as a museum ship	Hikawa Maru, pictured May 22, 1930.
SS Himalaya	1948	Scrapped at Kaohsiung, Taiwan in 1975	S.S. Himalaya
SS Iberia	1954	Scrapped at Kaohsiung, Taiwan in 1973	
SS India	1896	Sunk by German submarine SM U-22 on 8 August 1915	S.S. India
SS Ivernia	1899	Torpedoed and sunk on January 1, 1917	Ivernia in 1902
SS Jan Pieterszoon Coen	1914	Scuttled and sunk, May 14, 1940	S.S. Jan Pieterszoon Coen in 1935.
SS Kaisar-I-Hind	1914	Scrapped in 1938	S.S. Kaiser-I-Hind
SS Kaiser Wilhelm der Grosse	1897	Scuttled on August 26, 1914, as a result of the Battle of Río de Oro	Kaiser Wilhelm der Grosse
SS Kenya	1950	Scrapped in 1969	
MS Klipfontein	1939	Sank after striking an unknown object in 1953.	MS Klipfontein
SS Kroonland	1902	Scrapped in 1927	SS Kroonland in 1903.
SS L'Atlantique	1930	Scrapped in 1936	SS L'Atlantique
SS La Bourgogne	1885	Collided with Cromartyshire, and sank on July 4, 1898, off Sable Island	La Bourgogne, circa 1895
SS La Touraine	1890	Scrapped in 1923	S.S. La Touraine
RMS Laconia	1911	Torpedoed and sunk on February 15, 1917, by the German U-boat U-50	R.M.S. Laconia at New York in 1912.
RMS Laconia	1921	Torpedoed and sunk on September 12, 1942, by U-156	RMS Laconia in 1921
SS Lapland	1908	Scrapped in 1934 – Osaka, Japan	SS Lapland arriving in port.
SS Laurentic	1908	Struck two mines and sank on January 25, 1917	S.S. Laurentic
SS Leonardo da Vinci	1958	Caught fire, and scrapped in 1982	Leonardo da Vinci on February 5, 1975.
RMS Lucania	1893	Caught fire, and scrapped in 1909	R.M.S. Lucania
SS Lusitania	1906	Wrecked on Bellows Rock off Cape Point, South Africa, on 18 April 1911	S.S. Lusitania
RMS Lusitania	1906	Torpedoed and sunk on May 7, 1915	RMS Lusitania coming into port.
RMS Magdalena	1889	Scrapped in 1921	
RMS Magdalena	1948	Wrecked in 1949	
SS Maheno	1905	Wrecked on Fraser Island, Queensland, July 7, 1935.	Hand colored postcard of the wreck of the S.S. Maheno
SS Main	1900	Scrapped in 1925	S.S. Main in New York
RMS Maloja	1923	Scrapped in 1954	S.S. Maloja in 1923.
SS Maloja	1910	Struck a mine and sank off Dover, February 1916	S.S. Maloja.
SS Marama	1907	Scrapped in 1937	Marama serving as a hospital ship in 1915.
SS Mariette Pacha	1925	Scuttled in 1944	S.S. Mariette Pacha.
SS Massilia	1920	Scuttled in 1944 and scrapped in 1946	S.S. Massilia, circa 1920
RMS Mauretania	1906	Scrapped in 1935	Mauretania alongside Turbinia in 1907. Mauretania as a cruise ship in 1933.
RMS Mauretania	1938	Scrapped in 1965	Mauretania in the Caribbean.
MS Marnix van Sint Aldegonde	1929	Bombed and Sunk, November 7, 1943	Marnix van Sint Aldegonde in port.
RMS Medina	1911	Torpedoed and sunk on April 28, 1917	
SS Megantic	1908	Scrapped in 1933 after being sold	Megantic at Millers Point, Sydney in 1920
SS Metagama	1915	Scrapped in 1934.	Metagama in 1927
SS Michelangelo	1962	Scrapped in 1991	SS Michelangelo in New York City.
MS Mikhail Lermontov	1970	Struck rocks and sank on February 16, 1986, near Marlborough Sounds	Mikhail Lermontov in Tilbury
SS Minnewaska	1923	Scrapped in 1934	SS Minnewaska departing the city of New York
SS Minnetonka	1924	Scrapped in 1934	SS Minnetonka departing New York City
SS Missanabie	1914	Torpedoed and sunk on 9 September 1918.	Missanabie in October 1914
RMS Moldavia	1903	Torpedoed and sunk on May 23, 1918	RMS Moldavia
SS Montrose	1897	Wrecked on Goodwin Sands on 20 December 1914	SS Montrose
RMS Mooltan	1923	Scrapped at Faslane, Scotland, in 1954	R.M.S. Mooltan
SS Mulbera	1922	Scrapped in 1954	
SS Naldera	1920	Scrapped in 1938	
SS Narkunda	1920	Sunk on 14 November 1942	S.S.Narkunda
HMHS Newfoundland	1925	Bombed by German aircraft in September, 1943 then subsequently scuttled	HMHS Newfoundland leaving Algiers harbor, 1943.
RMS Niagara	1912	Sank after striking a mine, June 19, 1940	R.M.S. Niagara
RMS Niagara (1847)	1847	Wrecked near South Stack, Anglesey on June 6, 1875	
SS Nieuw Amsterdam	1937	Scrapped at Kaohsiung, Taiwan in 1974	Nieuw Amsterdam at the Hook of Holland in 1949.
SS Northern Star	1961	Scrapped in 1975	S.S. Northern Star
RMS Nova Scotia	1926	Torpedoed and sank in 1942	R.M.S. Nova Scotia
RMS Oceanic	1870	Scrapped in 1896	SS Oceanic in 1895
RMS Oceanic	1899	Ran aground off, Foula, Shetland on September 8, 1914, fully scrapped by 1979	R.M.S. Oceanic
Oceanic (unfinished ship)	Never launched	Partly built hull was deconstructed, and melted down to make the smaller MV Britannic (1929) and MV Georgic (1931)	R.M.M.V Oceanic
RMS Olympic	1911	Scrapped in 1935	R.M.S. Olympic in New York.
SS Orbita	1914	Scrapped in 1950	S.S. Orbita in 1916.
SS Orcades	1937	Torpedoed and sunk on October 10, 1942, by U-172	The S.S. Orcades berthed in Wellington Harbour, sometime in the 1940s
SS Orcades	1947	Scrapped in 1973	The ocean liner Orcades
SS Orduña	1913	Scrapped in 1951 – Scotland	S.S. Orduña in New York.
SS Oregon	1883	Collided with an unidentified schooner, and sank in 1886 off Long Island, New York	S.S. Oregon
SS Oriana	1959	Scrapped in 2005	S.S. Oriana in Vava'u, Tonga, circa 1985
RMS Orion	1934	Scrapped in 1963	R.M.S. Orion
SS Oronsay	1924	Torpedoed and sunk off Liberia on October 9, 1942	Oronsay in 1940.
SS Oronsay	1950	Scrapped in 1975	S.S. Oronsay in 1950.
SS Orontes	1929	Scrapped in 1962 – Valencia, Spain	SS Orontes in Tilbury Docks, circa 1957.
SS Oropesa (1919)	1919	Torpedoed and sunk by U-96, January 16, 1941.	SS Oropesa
SS Orsova	1908	Scrapped in 1936	S.S. Orsova being towed.
SS Orsova	1953	Scrapped in 1974 – Taiwan	Orsova in 1966
MS Oslofjord	1938	Struck a mine and sank in 1941	M/S Oslofjord in 1938
HMS Otranto	1909	Collided with HMS Kashmir, and sank on October 6, 1918	S.S. Otranto in 1909.
SS Otway	1909	Torpedoed and sunk off the Hebrides on July 23, 1917	SS Otway sometime between 1909 and 1917
SS Pacific	1849	Vanished and presumed lost January 1856	Steamship Pacific in 1849
Pacific	1850	Collided with SS Orpheus, and sank on November 4, 1875	SS Pacific, from a drawing commissioned early in its career.
RMS Pannonia	1902	Scrapped in 1922	RMS Pannonia under way.
SS Paris	1916	Caught fire, and capsized in Le Havre on April 18, 1939; scrapped on the spot in 1947	S.S Paris circa 1916.
SS Patria	1913	Sunk by sabotage on November 25, 1940. Scrapped on site in 1952	S.S Patria circa 1918-1919.
SS Pavonia	1882	Scrapped in 1900	Painting of S.S Pavonia.
SS Persia (1900)	1900	Torpedoed and sunk by SM U-38 on December 30, 1915	S.S. Persia circa 1900.
MS Pieter Corneliszoon Hooft	1925	Caught fire, and scrapped in 1932	The Pieter Corneliszoon Hooft in Batavia, Indonesia.
MS Piłsudski	1934	Sank on November 26, 1939, by either striking a mine or being torpedoed	MS Piłsudski in New York
SS President	1840	Vanished and presumed lost March 1841	The S.S. President
SS President Coolidge	1931	Struck two mines and sank on October 26, 1942	S.S. President Coolidge at sea, 1930s
USS President Lincoln	1907	Torpedoed and sunk by U-90 on May 31, 1918	S.S. President Lincoln sometime before World War One
SS Pretoria	1897	Scrapped in 1921	S.S. Pretoria in 1898
SS Queen Elizabeth 2	1967	Preserved as a museum/hotel ship in Dubai	Queen Elizabeth 2 in Osaka, March 19, 2008
RMS Queen Mary	1934	Preserved as a museum/hotel ship in Long Beach, California	RMS Queen Mary in Long Beach
RMS Queen Mary 2	2003	In service	Queen Mary 2 at Trondheim, 2007
SS Raffaello	1963	Partially sank in 1983	S.S. Raffaello somewhere near port.
SS Rajputana	1925	Torpedoed and sunk off Iceland in 1941	SS Rajputana on a postcard
SS Ranchi	1925	Scrapped in 1953	S.S. Ranchi
MS Rangitane	1929	Attacked by German merchant raiders, and sank on November 27, 1940	MS Rangitane on a postcard.
RMS Rangitata	1929	Scrapped in 1962	R.M.S. Rangita
RMS Rangitiki	1928	Scrapped in 1962	R.M.S. Rangitiki
SS Ranpura	1924	Scrapped in 1961	
SS Reina del Mar	1955	Scrapped in 1975	Reina del Mar with the Edinburgh Castle, 1948.
MV Reina del Pacifico	1930	Scrapped in 1958	American troops climbing into assault landing craft from Reina Del Pacifico, during Operation Torch.
SS Rex	1931	Bombed by Allies, and sunk on September 8, 1944	S.S. Rex in 1933, shortly after receiving the Blue Riband
SS Rochambeau	1911	Scrapped in 1934 or 1936	Le Rochambeau departing the city of Saint-Nazaire
RMS Samaria	1922	Scrapped in 1956	R.M.S. Samaria
RMS Saxonia	1899	Scrapped in 1925	R.M.S. Saxonia in 1900.
RMS Scythia	1920	Scrapped in 1958	R.M.S. Scythia
SS Scythia	1875	Scrapped in 1899	S.S. Scythia
SS Servia	1881	Scrapped in 1902	S.S. Servia
SS Simon Bolivar	1927	Sank after striking a mine on November 18, 1939	
SS Slamat	1924	Sunk by bombers on April 27, 1941.	S.S. Slamat
MS St. Louis	1928	Scrapped at Hamburg, Germany in 1952	S.S. St. Louis in the port of Hamburg
SS Saint Paul	1895	Scrapped in 1923	S.S. Saint Paul near the city of New York, circa 1895.
NS Savannah	1959	Preserved as a museum ship in Baltimore, Maryland	Savannah in 1990
SS Statendam	1924	Caught Fire in Rotterdam on May 11, 1940. Scrapped at Hendrik-Ido-Ambacht three months later.	Statendam on her sea trials.
MV Stirling Castle	1935	Scrapped at Mihara, Japan in 1966	R.M.M.V. Stirling Castle
MS Stockholm	1938	Caught fire, and scrapped in 1938	
RMS Strathaird	1931	Scrapped at Hong Kong in 1962	RMS Strathaird beneath the Sydney Harbour Bridge
RMS Strathnaver	1931	Scrapped at Hong Kong in 1962	R.M.S. Strathnaver in 1937
SS Tararua	1864	Wrecked on Otara Reef in New Zealand, April 29, 1881	Woodcut print of the wreck of the S.S. Tararua
Terukuni Maru	1929	Struck a mine and sank in 1939 off the coast of the United Kingdom	Terukuni Maru
RMS Titanic	1912	Sank in 1912 on her maiden voyage	R.M.S. Titanic
SS Transylvania	1914	Torpedoed and sunk on May 4, 1917, by German U-boat U-63	R.M.S. Transylvania.
RMS Transylvania	1925	Torpedoed and sunk on August 10, 1940, by U-56	R.M.S. Transylvania on a postcard
SS Tuscania	1914	Torpedoed and sunk on February 5, 1918, by UB-77	SS Tuscania, circa 1914
SS Ultonia	1898	Torpedoed and sunk on June 27, 1917, by SM U-53	Ultonia at anchor in 1899.
RMS Umbria	1884	Scrapped in 1910	The R.M.S. Umbria heading out of River Mersey.
SS United States	1951	Sunk as an artificial reef, November 11, 2026.	SS United States on July 16, 2017
SS Vaterland	1940	Bombed by Allies in 1943, the wreck was scrapped in 1948	A model of the S.S. Vaterland
RMS Viceroy of India	1928	Torpedoed and sunk in 1942 by U-407	R.M.S. Viceroy of India on a postcard, circa 1935.
TSS Wahine	1912	Wrecked on Masela Island Reef in the Arafura Sea, August 15, 1951	T.S.S. Wahine in Wellington Harbour, circa 1936
SS Waratah	1908	Vanished and presumed lost 1909	Postcard of Waratah in November 1908.
SS Warrimoo	1892	Collided with the destroyer Catapulte and sank, May 1918	SS Warrimoo, pictured sometime before 1918.
MS Wanganella	1929	Scrapped in 1970	Wanganella in her pre-war livery A.H.S. Wanganella as a hospital ship M.S. Wanganella after the war, pictured here in a cove of Doubtful Sound.
RMS Windsor Castle	1921	Torpedoed and sunk on March 23, 1943, by German aircraft off Algiers, Algeria	S.S. Windsor Castle
SS Winifredian	1889	Scrapped in 1929	S.S. Winifredian, pictured here in Boston.

== Multi-name ==
Note: The ships listed here were renamed, and in some cases multiple times in their careers.

=== A-D ===
Ship name	Year launched	Other names	Fate	Image
MS Achille Lauro	1947	MS Willem Ruys (1947–1965)	Caught fire and sank off Somalia on December 2, 1994	As MS Willem Ruys As Achille Lauro
SS Admiral Nakhimov	1925	SS Berlin (1925–1949)	Collided with the Pyotr Vasev, and sank on August 31, 1986	As the Berlin As the Admiral Nakhimov
USS Aeolus (ID-3005)	1899	SS Grosser Kurfürst (1899–1917); USS Grosser Kurfurst (1917–1919); SS City of Los Angeles (1922–1937)	Scrapped in 1937 – Japan	Grosser Kurfurst in January 1903. U.S.S. Aeolus in port, 1919
MS Agamemnon	1946	Sincere (1966–1969)	Caught fire, and sank in 1969	
SS Akaroa (1914)	1914	Euripides (1914–1932)	Scrapped in 1954	Euripides in the London Docks, sometime about 1920, painted by William Lionel Wyllie S.S. Akaroa at New Plymouth, New Zealand, circa 1934.
SS Alaska (1881)	1881	Magallanes (1897–1902)	Scrapped in 1902	S.S. Alaska photographed sometime in the 1890s.
SS Albania (1920)	1920	California (1930–1941)	Torpedoed and sunk off Syracuse on August 11, 1941	S.S. Albania under tow.
SS Albert Ballin	1922	Hansa (1935–1945); Sovetskiy Soyuz (1953–1980)	Scrapped in 1981	S.S. Albert Ballin, circa 1923 Cargo ship Sovetskiy Soyuz, pictured in 1957
RMS Alcantara (1926)	1926	HMS Alcantara (1939–1943); Kaisho Maru (1958)	Scrapped in 1958	R.M.S. Alcantara outside of Rio de Janeiro
MS Aleksandr Pushkin	1964	Marco Polo (1991–2021)	Scrapped in Alang, India in 2021. Work completed in 2022.	MS Aleksandr Pushkin in the summer of 1970. Marco Polo in the port of Tallinn, circa August 2, 2012
SS Algeria	1870	SS Pennland (1881–1903)	Scrapped in 1903	S.S. Algeria
USS America (ID-3006)	1905	Amerika (1905–1917); USAT America (1919–1920); SS America(1920–1931); USAT Edmund B. Alexander (1940–1957)	Scrapped in 1957	SS Amerika, sometime before 1914 America arrives in Boston Harbor, circa April 5, 1919 USS America sunk at her mooring. USAT America, circa 1919 S.S. America circa 1920s U.S.A.T. Edmund B. Alexander
SS America (1939)	1939	USS West Point (1941–1946); SS Australis (1964–1978); SS Italis (1978–1980); SS Noga (1980–1984); SS Alferdoss (1984–1993); SS American Star (1994–2008)	Wrecked at Playa de Garcey, Fuerteventura in 1994, whilst under tow to become a hotel ship off Phuket, Thailand.	America in Bremerhaven USS West Point Australis S.S. Italis As Noga/Alferdoss The wreck of the American Star
MS Ancerville	1962	MV Minghua (1973–1983)	Preserved as a hotelship	Minghua as part of the Sea World Complex
RMS Antonia	1922	HMS Wayland (1942–1948)	Scrapped in 1948	RMS Antonia underway.
SS Arabic (1920)	1908	SS Berlin (1908–1920)	Scrapped in 1931	SS Arabic at sea
MS Aramis	1931	Teiyō Maru (1942–1944)	Torpedoed and sank on August 18, 1944	M.S. Aramis, circa 1932 Teiyō Maru as a repatriation ship, circa 1943
SS Argentina (1929)	1929	SS Pennsylvania (1929–1938)	Scrapped in 1964	One of the 3 sister ships of Argentina.
SS Arundel Castle	1894	SS Birma (1905–1913); SS Mitava (1913–1921) SS Josef Pilsudski (1921–1923); SS Franck Hellmers (1923–1924); SS Wilbo (1924)	Scrapped in 1924	SS Birma on a 1914 postcard. Arundel Castle and Dunottar Castle in Capetown. Arundel Castle is on the right. H.S. Mitava, circa 1918.
SS Arizona	1879	Hancock (1898–1926)	Scrapped in 1926	S.S. Arizona while she held the Atlantic Record USS Hancock.
HMS Artifex	1924	RMS Aurania (1924–1942)	Scrapped in 1961	RMS Aurania HMS Artifex
SS Ascania	1911	Gerona (During construction)	Wrecked near Cape Ray in 1918	SS Ascania.
SS Athenic	1901	SS Pelagos (1928–1962)	Scrapped in 1962	S.S. Athenic Hvalfangerselskapet Pelagos, circa 1931
RMS Atrato (1888)	1888	The Viking (1912–1914); HMS Viknor (1914–1915)	Torpedoed and sank on January 13, 1915	
SS Augusta Victoria (1888)	1888	Kuban (1904–1907)	Scrapped in 1907	Augusta Victoria under steam
MS Augustus (1926)	1926	Falco (1939–1940); Sparviero (1940–1946)	Scuttled in Genoa in 1944, raised and scrapped in 1946	
MS Augustus (1950)	1950	Great Sea (1976–1980); Ocean King (1980–1983); Philippines (1983–1985); President (1985–1987); Asian Princess (1987–1999); M/S Philippines (1999–2011); Philippine (2011–2012)	Scrapped at Alang, India in 2012	Postcard of Augustus M.S. Philippines, as a floating hotel and restaurant in 2011.
MV Aureol	1951	Marianna IV (1974–2001); Mariann IV(2001)	Scrapped at Alang, India in 2001	
SS Ausonia (1909)	1909	Tortona (1909-1911)	Torpedoed and sunk on May 30, 1918	SS Ausonia in 1911
SS Ausonia (1956)	1956	The Ausonia (2006); Ivory(2006–2007); Aegean Two (2007–2008); Ivory(2008–2010); Winner 5 (2010)	Scrapped at Alang, India in 2010	SS Ausonia arriving in Genoa Ivory, laid up in Eleusis in 2008.
SS Avoca	1891	SS San Fernando (1895–1897); SS Atlanta (1907–1908); SS Uranium (1909–1916); SS Feltria (1916–1918)	Torpedoed and sunk by UC-48 on 5 May 1917	Avoca departing port
SS Baltic (1871)	1871	SS Veendam (1889–1898)	Collided with a derelict ship, and sank on February 6, 1898	Baltic anchored in port
SS Belgenland (1914)	1914	Belgic (1916–1923); Columbia (1935–1936)	Scrapped in 1936 – Scotland	Belgic in 1917 Belgenland, after being refitted in 1923.
SS Bergensfjord	1913	Argentina (1946–1953); Jerusalem (1953–1957); Aliya (1957–1959)	Scrapped in 1959	
MS Bergensfjord (1955)	1955	De Grasse (1971–1973); Rasa Sayang (1973–1978); Golden Moon (1978–1980); Rasa Sayang (1980)	Caught fire, and capsized in Perama, Greece on August 27, 1980	Bergensfjord in Amsterdam
MV Bloemfontein Castle	1949	Patris (1959–1979); Mediterranean Island (1979–1981); Mediterranean Star (1981–1988); Terra (1988–1989)	Scrapped at Gadani Beach, Pakistan in 1987	Bloemfontein Castle entering London Patris, in Sydney 1973.
SS Brazil (1928)	1928	SS Virginia (1928–1938)	Scrapped in 1964	Virginia at the Panama Canal
MV Brazil Maru	1954	Toba Brazil Maru (1974–1997); Zhanjiang (1997–1998); Hai Shang Cheng Shi (1998–)	Beached as a restaurant in Zhanjiang, China, currently closed	Brazil Maru sailing
SS Bremen (1896)	1896	SS Constantinople (1919–1921); SS King Alexander (1922–1929)	Scrapped in 1929	Bremen in New York
SS Bretagne (1951)	1951	SS Brittany (1962–1963)	Caught fire, and gutted on April 8, 1963; scrapped	Brittany in Sydney Cove
RMS Britannia	1840	SMS Barbarossa (1849 – to German Confederation) SMS Barbarossa (1852 – to Prussian Navy)	Cunard's first ocean liner – sunk as target ship by Prussian Navy July 1880	painting of Britannia on her maiden voyage.
SS Burdigala	1898	Kaiser Friedrich (1898–1912)	Sunk by mine, 14 November 1916	Kaiser Friedrich underway Burdigala, in 1912.
SS Calgaric	1918	Orca (1918–1927)	Scrapped in 1934	Orca as completed in 1918 Calgaric, in Port.
SS California (1928)	1928	SS Uruguay (1938–1964)	Scrapped in 1964	California entering Havana
SS Cambodge	1952	Stella V (1970); Stella Solaris (1970–2003); S. Solar (2003)	Scrapped in Alang, India in 2003	
RMS Cameronia (1919)	1919	HMT Cameronia (1941–1945); SS Empire Clyde (1953–1957)	Scrapped in 1957	Cameronia underway
RMS Carinthia (1955)	1955	SS Fairland (1968–1971); SS Fairsea (1971–1988); SS Fair Princess (1988–2000); SS China Sea Discovery (2000–2005); Sea Discovery (2005)	Scrapped in 2005 in Alang, India	SS Carinthia, sometime during the 1950s SS Fairsea and Fairwind laid up in Southampton Fair Princess at Darling Harbour. China Sea Discovery, in 2002
RMS Caronia (1947)	1947	Columbia (1968); Caribia (1968–1974)	Wrecked in 1974 at Apra Harbour, Guam; subsequently scrapped	Caronia anchored in the Trondheim Fjord
SS Cephalonia	1882	Hailor (1900–1904)	Scuttled as a block ship during the Russo-Japanese War in 1904	Cephalonia departing port
USS Charles (ID-1298)	1907	USS Harvard (1918; 1920–1931)	Wrecked in 1931	USS Charles in 1918.
Chichibu Maru	1930	Titibu Maru (1938–1939); Kamakura Maru (1939–1943)	Torpedoed and sunk by USS Gudgeon on April 28, 1943	Kamakura Maru with Mount Fuji
SS City of Berlin	1874	SS Berlin (1893–1898); SS Meade (1898–1921)	Scrapped in 1921	City of Berlin entering New York
SS City of Paris (1865)	1865	Tonquin (1884–1885)	Collided with another French vessel, and sank in March 1885	City of Paris anchored in port
SS City of Paris (1888)	1888	Yale (1898–1901); Harrisburg (1918–1919); Philadelphia (1901–1918, 1919–1923)	Scrapped in 1923 at Genoa, Italy	City of Paris in the 1890s USS Yale, in Cuba .
MS City of York	1953	Mediterranean Sky (1971–2003)	Capsized at Perama, Greece in January 2003	City of York in London in 1967 Mediterranean Sky, in 1986.
SS Cleveland	1908	USS Mobile (1919–1920); SS King Alexander (1920–1923); SS Cleveland (1923–1933)	Scrapped in 1933	Cleveland in Hong Kong
SS Colombie	1931	USAHS Aleda E. Lutz (1945–1946); SS Colombie (1946–1964); SS Atlantica (1964–1974)	Scrapped in 1974	Colombie departing port
SS Constitution	1950	Oceanic Constitution (1974–1982); Constitution (1982–1997)	Sank off of the Hawaiian Islands on November 17, 1997, whilst under tow to Alang, India for scrap	Postcard of SS Constitution
SS Columbus	1924	Hindenburg (1913–1919)	Scuttled by the crew in 1939 to avoid capture by the Royal Navy	Columbus after her 1929 refit
SS Consuelo	1900	SS Cairnrona (1909–1911); RMS Albania (1911–1912); SS Poleric (1912–1929)	Scrapped in 1930	Albania underway
SS Conte Biancamano	1925	USS Hermitage (1942–1946)	Dismantled at La Spezia, Italy, and partly reassembled as a museum in Milan, Italy 1964	
USS Covington (ID-1409)	1908	SS Cincinnati (1908–1917)	Torpedoed and sank on July 1, 1918, by a U-86	Cincinnati in 1911
SS Czar	1912	SS Estonia (1921–1930); SS Pułaski (1930–1946); SS Empire Penryn (1946–1949)	Scrapped in 1949 at Blyth, Northumberland	Czar in port
SS Dante Alighieri	1914	SS Ashai Maru (1928–1944)	Beached and abandoned in 1944, scrapped on site in 1949	Asahi Maru as a Japanese hospital ship
SS De Grasse	1924	RMS Empress of Australia (1953–1956); Venezuela (1956–1962)	Scrapped in 1962	De Grasse as built
SS Deutschland (1900)	1900	SS Viktoria Luise (1910–1921); SS Hansa (1921–1925)	Scrapped in 1925	Deutschland departing New York. Victoria Luise, in 1912.
QSMV Dominion Monarch	1938	Dominion Monarch Maru (1962)	Scrapped in 1962 at Osaka	Dominion Monarch in Table Bay
MV Doulos Phos	1914	SS Medina (1914–1948); SS Roma (1948–1953); MS Franca C (1953–1977); MV Doulos (1977–2010)	Preserved as a hotelship	SS Medina in New York on her maiden voyage. Postcard featuring the SS Franca C. The Doulos at Southampton, England in 2004 MV Doulos Phos in Bintan. Picture taken in 2022.
SS Drottningholm	1904	RMS Virginian (1904–1920); Brasil (1948–1951); Homeland (1951–1955)	Scrapped at Trieste, Italy in 1955	A Post card featuring the RMS Virginian SS Drottningholm
MS Dunnottar Castle	1936	Victoria (1958–1975); The Victoria (1976–1993); Princesa Victoria (1993–2004); Victoria I (2004)	Scrapped at 2004 at Alang, India	Dunnotar Castle in Egypt Princesa Victoria, in Cyprus.
RMS Dunottar Castle	1890	SS Caribbean (1913–1914); HMS Caribbean (1914–1915)	Sank in a storm on September 27, 1915	Dunottar Castle

=== E-H ===
Ship name	Year launched	Other names	Fate	Image
SS Elisabethville (1921)	1921	Empire Bure (1947–1950); Charlton Star (1950–1958); Maristrella (1958–1960)	Scrapped in 1960	Elisabethville
SS Empire Bittern	1902	SS Iowa (1902–1913); SS Bohemia (1913–1917); Artemis (1917–1941); SS Empire Bittern (1941–1944)	Largely livestock or troop transport. Briefly commissioned USS Artemis April–October 1919. Scuttled in 1944 as an additional blockship for Operation Overlord.	USS Artemis in 1919
SS Empire Fowey	1935	SS Potsdam (1935–1945); HMT Empire Jewel (1946-1947); Safina-E-Hujjaj (1961–1976)	Scrapped in 1976	SS Potsdam arriving in Antwerp
HMT Empire Windrush	1930	MV Monte Rosa (1930–1947)	Caught fire and sank in the Mediterranean Sea with the loss of four crew, March 30, 1954	HMT Empire Windrush
RMS Empress of Australia (1919)	1913	Admiral von Tirpitz (1913–1921); Empress of China (1921)	Scrapped at Inverkeithing, Scotland in 1952	RMS Empress Of Australia in the 1920s
RMS Empress of Britain (1905)	1905	SS Montroyal (1924–1930)	Scrapped in 1930	RMS Empress Of Britain underway
RMS Empress of Britain (1955)	1955	Queen Anna Maria (1964–1975); Carnivale (1975–1993); Fiestamarina (1993–1994); Olympic (1995–1997); The Topaz (1997–2008); Topaz (2008)	Scrapped in 2008	RMS Empress of Britain Carnivale in Miami As The Topaz
RMS Empress of Canada (1928)	1928	SS Duchess of Richmond (1928–1947)	Caught fire, and capsized on January 25, 1953; scrapped in 1954 at La Spezia	RMS Empress of Canada arriving in Montreal
RMS Empress of Canada (1960)	1960	Mardi Gras (1972–1993); Olympic (1993); Star of Texas (1994); Lucky Star (1994–1995); Apollon (1995–2003)	Scrapped in 2003	Empress of Canada on her maiden voyage Mardi Gras in Montreal
RMS Empress of England	1957	SS Ocean Monarch (1970–1975)	Scrapped in 1975	
RMS Empress of France (1913)	1913	SS Alsatian (1912–1919)	Scrapped in 1934 at Dalmuir	RMS Empress of France in Vancouver
RMS Empress of France (1928)	1928	SS Duchess of Bedford (1928–1947)	Scrapped in 1960	RMS Empress of France departing port
RMS Empress of India (1890)	1890	SS Loyalty (1915–1923)	Scrapped in 1923	RMS Empress of India underway
RMS Empress of Japan (1929)	1930	RMS Empress of Scotland (1942–1957); TS Hanseatic (1957–1966)	Caught fire, and gutted in 1966; subsequently scrapped	RMS Empress of Japan in Vancouver Empress of Scotland during WW2 TS Hanseatic underway
RMS Empress of Scotland (1906)	1905	SS Kaiserin Auguste Victoria (1906–1919)	Scrapped in 1930	Kaiserin Auguste Victoria
SS Eugenio C	1964	Eugenio Costa (1987–1999); Edinburgh Castle (1999–2000); The Big Red Boat II (2000–2004); Red Boat (2004–2005)	Scrapped at Alang, India in 2005	SS Eugenio C
SS Europa (1928)	1928	USS Europa (1945–1946); SS Liberté (1950–1963)	Scrapped at La Spezia, Italy in 1963	Europa before her maiden voyage Liberte, underway.
Fairsky	1942	SS Steel Artisan (1941); USS Barnes (1942); HMS Attacker (1942–1945); Castel Forte (1950–1958)	Scrapped in 1980	Fairsky underway in 1974
TSS Fairstar	1955	Oxfordshire (1955–1964)	Scrapped at Alang, India in 1997	TSS Fairsea
SS Flandre (1952)	1951	Carla C (1968–1986); Carla Costa (1986–1992); Pallas Athena (1992–1994)	Scrapped in 1994	Flandre on her maiden voyage Pallas Athena, in Istanbul.
SS France (1961)	1960	SS Norway (1979–2008)	Scrapped at Alang, India in 2007, work completed in 2008.	France moored in Le Havre Norway, in 1984.
SS Fürst Bismarck (1890)	1890	Don (1905); Moskva (1906–1917); San Guisto (1917–1924)	Scrapped in 1924 – Italy	painting of SS Furst Bismarck
SS Fürst Bismarck (1905)	1905	Amboise (1922–1935)	Scrapped in 1935 – Italy	SS Fürst Bismarck
SS Galileo Galilei	1961	Galileo (1984–1990); Meridian (1990–1997); Sun Vista (1997–1999)	Caught fire, and sank on May 21, 1999	SS Galileo Galilei in Sydney Galileo in 1989 Meridian sailing by the San Blas Islands
SS Galician	1900	Glenart Castle (1914–1918)	Torpedoed and sunk on February 26, 1918	Glenart Castle as a hospital ship
SS General von Steuben	1923	München (1923-1930); Steuben (1938–1954)	Sunk by Soviet submarine S-13, 10 February 1945	SS General von Steuben
SS George Washington	1908	USS George Washington (1917–1919); SS George Washington (1921–1931); USS Catlin (AP-19) (1941); USAT George Washington (1943–1951)	Scrapped in 1951	George Washington underway in 1909
SS Gothic (1893)	1893	Gothland (1907–1911) – (1913–1925)	Scrapped in 1925	Gothic in New Zealand Gothland, underway.
MS Gripsholm (1924)	1924	MS Berlin (1954–1966)	Scrapped in 1966	MS Gripsholm in Gothenburg.
MS Gripsholm (1957)	1957	MS Navarino (1975–1984); MS Regent Sea (1984–1997); Sea (1997–2001)	Sank on July 12, 2001, whilst under tow to Alang, India for scrap	MS Gripsholm in Hamburg, 1973.
SS Guglielmo Marconi	1961	Costa Riviera (1983–1993); American Adventure (1993–1994); Costa Riviera (1994–2001)	Scrapped in 2001	As the Guglielmo Marconi As the American Adventure As the Costa Riviera
SS Hamburg (1925)	1925	Yuri Dolgoruki (1950–1977)	Scrapped in 1977	Postcard of Hamburg Yuri Dolgoruki, in 1960.
USS Harris (APA-2)	1921	Pine Tree State (1921–1922); President Grant (1922–1930)	Scrapped in 1948	USS Harris in 1944.
SS Heliopolis (1907)	1907	SS Royal George (1910–1922)	Scrapped in 1922	Royal George at Avonmouth dock.
RMS Hibernia	1842	Habanois (1850–1868)	Lost in 1868	Postcard of RMS Hibernia
RMS Homeric (1913)	1913	Columbus (1913–1919)	Scrapped in 1935	Homeric departing port
USS Huron (ID-1408)	1896	SS Friedrich der Grosse (1896–1917); USS Fredrick Der Grosse (1917–1919); SS City of Honolulu (1922)	Caught fire, and sank on October 17, 1922, by gunfire after a failed towing attempt	Friedrich der Grosse in port City of Honolulu, Ablaze before sinking.

=== I–L ===
Ship name	Year launched	Other names	Fate	Image
SS Île de France	1926	S.S. Furansu Maru (1958–1959, 1959); R.M.S. Claridon (1959)	Scrapped at Osaka, Japan in 1959	
SS Imperator	1912	USS Imperator (1919–1920); RMS Berengaria (1920–1939)	Scrapped in 1946 (fully)	As Imperator USS Imperator with USS Leviathan. Imperator is on the left. As Berengaria
SS Independence	1950	Oceanic Independence (1974); Sea Luck I (1974–1975); Oceanic Independence (1975–1982); Independence (1982–2006); Oceanic (2006–2009); Platinum II (2009–2011)	Wrecked in 2010 off of Alang, India; scrapped on the spot	SS Independence at sea Oceanic being towed out of San Francisco
SS Infante Dom Henrique	1960	Vasco de Gama (1986–1997); SeaWind Crown (1991–2003); Barcelona (2003–2004)	Scrapped near Guangzhou, China in 2004	
SS Justicia	1914	Statendam (1914–1916)	Torpedoed and sunk in July, 1918	SS Justicia in 1917
SS Kaiser Wilhelm II	1902	USS Kaiser Wilhelm II (1917); USS Agamemnon (1917–1927); USAT Monticello (1927–1940)	Scrapped in 1940	Kaiser Wilhelm II in 1905 USS Agamemnon during WW1.
RMS Kenya Castle	1952	SS Amerikanis (1967–2001)	Scrapped at Alang, India in 2001	SS Kenya Castle underway Amerikanis in Bermuda, 1987.
SS Khedive Ismail	1922	Aconcagua (1922–1935)	Torpedoed and sunk on February 12, 1944	
SS König Albert	1899	Fernandino Palasciano (1915–1923); Italia (1923–1926)	Scrapped in 1926 – Italy	
SS Königin Luise (1896)	1896	Omar (1921–1924); Edison (1924–1935)	Scrapped in 1935 – Italy	Königin Luise in Fremantle W.A.
SS Kościuszko	1915	SS Czaritza (1915–1921); SS Lituania (1921–1930); SS ORP Gdynia (1939); SS Empire Helford (1946–1950)	Scrapped in 1950	SS Kosciuszko entering Gdynia
SS Kronprinz Wilhelm	1901	USS Von Steuben (1917–1923)	Scrapped in 1923	SS Kronprinz Wilhelm USS Von Steuben in 1918.
SS Kronprinzessin Cecilie (1905)	1905	HMS Princess (1915–1923)	Scrapped in 1923.	SS Kronprinzessin Cecilie in Vera Cruz.
SS Kronprinzessin Cecilie (1906)	1906	Mount Vernon (1917–1940)	Scrapped in 1940	SS Kronprinzessin Cecilie underway, 1910 USAT Mount Vernon in 1920.
MS Kungsholm (1928)	1928	John Ericsson (1942–1947); Italia (1948–1964); Imperial Bahama (1964–1965)	Scrapped in Bilbao, Spain in 1965	SS Kungsholm at sea in November 1928.
MS Kungsholm (1952)	1952	Europa (1965–1981); Columbus C. (1981–1985)	Sank after striking a breakwater near Cádiz, Spain on July 29, 1984. Scrapped in Barcelona, Spain in 1985.	Kungsholm in 1954 MS Europa underway in 1966 MS Columbus C in Miami 1984
MV Kungsholm (1965)	1965	Sea Princess (1979–1995); Victoria (1995–2002); Mona Lisa (2002–2007); Oceanic II (2007–2008); Mona Lisa (2008–2010); Veronica (2010–2016)	Scrapped at Alang, India in 2016	As Kungsholm As the Sea Princess As Mona Lisa As the Oceanic II/The Scholar Ship
SS La Bretagne	1885	Alesia (1923)	Wrecked in 1923	SS La Bretagne
TSMS Lakonia	1929	Johan van Oldenbarnevelt (1929–1963)	Caught fire and sank on December 29, 1963, while under tow to Gibraltar for salvaging.	Johan van Oldenbarnevelt
RMS Lancastria	1920	RMS Tyrrhenia (1920–1924); HMT Lancastria (1940)	Bombed by German aircraft, and sank on June 17, 1940	RMS Lancastria entering port
SS Laos	1952	Empress Abeto (1970–1971); Malaysia Raya (1971–1976)	Caught fire at Port Klang, Malaysia on August 23, 1976. Scrapped at Kaohsiung, Taiwan in 1977.	
SS Lavia	1946	Media (1946–1961); Flavia (1961–1982); Flavian (1983–1986)	Caught fire, and sank in Hong Kong on January 7, 1989; scrapped at Kaohsiung, Taiwan, 5 months later	SS Media in the River Mersey. Flavia in Miami, 1981.
USS Leedstown	1913	Santa Lucia (1933–1942)	Sunk by U-331 on November 9, 1942	USS Leedstown
SS Letitia	1924	HMS Letitia (1939–1944); HMHS Letitia (1944–1946); Empire Brent (1946–1952); Captain Cook (1952–1960)	Scrapped in 1960	
SS Leviathan	1913	Vaterland (1913–1917)	Scrapped in 1938	As Vaterland As USS Leviathan, in her dazzle scheme As Leviathan
SS Lombardia	1914	William O'Swald (1914–1920); SS Brabantia (1920–1922); SS Resolute (1922–1935)	Bombed 1943, raised and scrapped 1946.	SS Lombardia in 1936
SS Lurline (1932)	1932	RHMS Ellinis (1963–1987)	Scrapped at Kaohsiung, Taiwan in 1987	As Lurline As Ellinis

=== M-P ===
Ship name	Year launched	Other names	Fate	Image
RFA Maine (1924)	1924	SS Leonardo da Vinci (1925–1943); SS Empire Clyde (1943–1947); RFA Empire Clyde (1947–1948)	Scrapped in 1954	HMHS Maine during WW2
RMS Majestic (1914)	1914	SS Bismarck (1914–1920); HMS Caledonia (1937–1943)	Caught fire, and sank on September 29, 1939; scrapped in 1943	Bismarck being launched As R.M.S. Majestic in 1934 HMS Caledonia being scrapped in 1943
SS Malolo	1926	Matsonia (1937–1948); Atlantic (1948–1955); Queen Frederica (1955–1977)	Scrapped in 1977 at Eleusis, Greece, work completed in the 1980s.	SS Queen Frederica at Halifax in 1962
SS Manchuria (1903)	1903	SS President Johnson (1928–1948); SS Santa Cruz (1948–1952)	Scrapped in 1952 at Savona, Italy	USS Manchuria underway in 1919
SS Manhattan (1931)	1931	USS Wakefield (1941–1964)	Scrapped in 1964	SS Manhattan at New York Wakefield in 1944
SS Mariposa	1931	SS Homeric (1953–1974)	Scrapped in 1974	SS Mariposa at anchor
SS Mariposa	1953	Pine Tree Mariner (1953–1956); Jin Jang (1982–1992); Queen of Jin Jang (1992-1995); Heng Li (1995-1996)	Scrapped in 1996	SS Jin Jang
TS Maxim Gorkiy	1968	Hamburg (1968–1973); Hanseatic (1973–1974); Maksim Gorkiy (1974–1992)	Scrapped in 2009	SS Maxim Gorkiy in June 2006
USS Mercury (ID-3012)	1896	SS Barbarossa (1896–1917)	Scrapped in 1924	A postcard of SS Barbarossa
SS Minnedosa	1917	Piemonte (1935–1949)	Scuttled in 1943 by Axis forces, wreck raised and scrapped in 1949	A postcard of SS Minnedosa
SS Miowera	1892	Maitai (1908–1910)	Ran Aground in Avarua, Rarotonga, on December 25, 1916.	SS Miowera at Sydney Harbour in 1903
SS Mongolia (1903)	1903	President Fillmore (1929–1940); Panamanian(1940–1946)	Scrapped in Shanghai, China in 1946	A painting of SS Mongolia
SS Mongolia (1922)	1922	SS Rimutaka (1938–1950); SS Europa (1950–1951); SS Nassau (1951–1961); SS Acapulco (1961–1963)	Scrapped in 1964	SS Mongolia anchored in port
SS Monterey	1931	Matsonia (1956–1963); Lurline (1963–1970); Britanis(1970–1998); Belofin-1 (1998–2000)	Sank in the Indian Ocean on October 21, 2000, while being towed to Alang, India for scrap	SS Monterey on her maiden voyage Britanis in 1990
SS Monterey	1952	Free State Mariner (1952–1957); Monte (2006)	Scrapped in 2006	SS Monterey in 1998
MV Moonta	1931	Lydia (1955–1966); Le Lydia (1966–)	Beached as a tourist attraction in Le Barcarès, France	Le Lydia as a tourist attraction
SS Neckar	1901	USS Antigone (1917–1921); SS Potomac (1921-1927)	Scrapped in 1927	USS Antigone underway in 1919
SS Nitta Maru	1939	Chūyō (1942–1943)	Torpedoed and sunk on December 4, 1943, by the USS Sailfish	SS Nitta Maru in 1940 IJNChūyūo at Truk in 1943
SS Noordam (1902)	1901	Kungsholm (1923–1926)	Scrapped in 1927	SS Noordam in 1903
SS Normandie	1932	USS Lafayette (1941–1946)	Caught fire and capsized in 1942; scrapped in 1946	Postcard of the Normandie USS Lafayette, capsized in Pier 88, winter of 1942
SS Oceanic (1965)	1963	StarShip Oceanic (1985–2000); Big Red Boat I (2000); Oceanic (2000–2012)	Scrapped at Zhoushan, China in 2012	As StarShip Oceanic As the Big Red Boat As Oceanic
SS Ocean Monarch (1950)	1950	Varna (1967–1977); Venus (1977); Riviera (1977–1981); Reina del Mar (1981)	Caught fire & sank, 1981	SS Ocean Monarch
MS Oranje	1938	Angelina Lauro (1965–1979)	Caught fire, and sank on September 24, 1979	As Oranje As the Angelina Lauro
SS Orcades (1921)	1906	Prinz Ludwig (1906–1921)	Scrapped in 1924	SS Orcades sometime in 1921
MS Oslofjord (1949)	1949	MS Fulvia (1969–1970)	Caught fire, and sank in 1970 while being towed	MS Oslofjord in Rotterdam
SS Panama (1939)	1939	USAT Panama (1941); USAT James Parker (1941–1946); James Parker (AP-46) (1941); SS Panama (1946–1957); President Hoover (1957–1965); SS Regina (1965–1973); SS Regina Prima (1973–1985)	Scrapped at Aliağa, Turkey in 1985	SS Panama on her maiden voyage
SS Parthia (1870)	1870	Victoria (1892–1954); Straits No. 27 (1954–1956); Straits Maru (1956)	Scrapped at Osaka, Japan, in 1956	A illustration of SS Parthia Victoria following her 1924 rebuild
RMS Parthia (1947)	1947	Remuera (1961–1965); Aramac (1965–1969)	Scrapped at Kaohsiung, Taiwan in 1969	RMS Parthia entering port
SS Pasteur (1938)	1938	Bremen (1957–1972); Regina Magna (1972–1977); Saudiphil I (1977–1980); Filipinas Saudi I (1980)	Sank in the Indian Ocean in 1980 while being towed to Kaohsiung, Taiwan for scrap	SS Pasteur Bremen in 1968
TS Patriot State	1964	Santa Mercedes (1964–1984)	Scrapped in 2011	USTS Patriot State in 1990s
RMS Pendennis Castle	1957	Ocean Queen (1976–1978); Sinbad I (1978–1980)	Scrapped at 1980 at Kaohsiung, Taiwan	RMS Pendennis Castle at Capetown in 1969
SS Pennland	1922	SS Pittsburgh (1920–1926)	Sunk on April 25, 1941	SS Pennland
SS Pennsylvania (1896)	1896	USS Nansemond (1919–1924)	Scrapped in 1924	SS Pennsylvania underway Nansemond in 1919
USS Pocahontas (ID-3044)	1900	SS Prinzess Irene (1900–1917); Bremen (1922–1928); SS Karlsruhe (1928–1932)	Scrapped in 1932	USS Pocahontas underway in 1919
SS Potsdam (1899)	1900	Stockholm (1915–1929); Solglimt (1929–1940); Sonderburg (1940–1944)	Scuttled in 1944 by German troops, fully scrapped by 1947	A Painting of Potsdam in 1900s Stockholm entering port The whaling factory ship Solglimt
USS Powhatan (ID-3013)	1899	SS Hamburg (1899–1917); New Rochelle (1920–1921); Hudson (1921–1922); President Fillmore (1922–1928)	Scrapped in 1928	USS Powhatan in port
SS President Cleveland (1920)	1920	Golden State (1920–1921); Tasker H. Bliss (1941–1942)	Torpedoed and sunk on November 12, 1942	USS Tasker H. Bliss at anchor
SS President Roosevelt (1921)	1921	Peninsula State (1921–1922); President Pierce (1922); Joseph T. Dickman (1940–1948)	Scrapped in 1948	SS President Roosevelt in 1925 Joseph T. Dickman at anchor in 1943
TS Pretoria	1936	TS Empire Doon (1945–1949); TS Gunung Djati (1949–1973); MV Gunung Djati (1973–1980); KRI Tanjung (1980–1984)	Scrapped in 1987	TS Pretoria
HMS Pretoria Castle (F61)	1938	RMMV Warwick Castle (1946–1962)	Scrapped in 1962	HMSPretoria Castle Warwick Castle Being assisted into port
RMS Pretoria Castle (1947)	1947	SS S.A. Oranje (1966–1975)	Scrapped at 1975 at Kaohsiung, Taiwan	SS Pretoria Castle off Cape Town in 1953
USS Princess Matoika	1900	SS Kiautschou (1900–1904); SS Princess Alice (1904–1917); USS Princess Matoika (1918–1919); USAT Princess Matoika (1919); SS Princess Matoika (1921–1922); SS President Arthur (1922–1926); SS City of Honolulu (1926–1930)	Caught fire, and scrapped in 1934	SS Princess Alice interned at Cebu, Philippines Princess Matoika in 1919
SS Principe di Piemonte	1907	SS Principello (1914–1916); SS Folia (1916–1917)	Torpedoed and sunk by U-53 on 11 March 1917	Principello under steam
SS Príncipe Perfeito	1960	Al Hasa (1976–1980); Fairsky (1980–1981); Vera (1981–1982); Marianna IX (1982–1984); Marianna 9 (1984–2001); Mariann 9 (2001)	Scrapped at Alang, India in 2001	SS Príncipe Perfeito Marianna 9 laid up in Eleusis, 2000
SS Prinz Eitel Friedrich (1904)	1904	USS Dekalb (1917-1920); SS Mount Clay (1920-1934)	Scrapped in 1934	SS Prinz Eitel Friedrich at the Philadelphia Navy Yard, on 28 March 1917
SS Prinz Friedrich Wilhelm	1907	USS Prinz Friedrich Wilhelm (1919); SS Empress of China (1921); RMS Empress of India (1921–1923); SS Montlaurier (1923–1925); SS Monteith (1925); SS Montnairn (1925–1929)	Scrapped in 1929 at Genoa	USS Prinz Friedrich Wilhelm at New York in 1919

=== Q-Z ===
Ship name	Year launched	Other names	Fate	Image
RMS Queen Elizabeth	1938	Elizabeth (1968–1970); Seawise University (1970–1972)	Caught fire and sank in Hong Kong on January 9, 1972. Scrapped on site between 1974 and 1975.	RMS Queen Elizabeth in 1967 Queen Elizabeth in 1942 The wreck of Seawise University
MS Regal Empress	1953	SS Olympia (1953–1981); SS Caribe (1981–1983); MS Caribe I (1983–1993)	Scrapped at Alang, India in 2009.	The Regal Empress
SS Reliance	1914	SS Johann Heinrich Burchard (1914–1920); SS Limburgia (1920–1926)	Burned 1938, scrapped 1941	SS Reliance
RMS Republic (1903)	1903	SS Columbus (1903)	Collided with the SS Florida, and sank on January 24, 1909	RMS Republic
SS Rhein	1899	USS Susquehanna (1917–1919); SS Susquehanna (1919–1928)	Scrapped in 1928	USS Susquehanna under way
SS Ryndam (1950)	1950	Atlas (1972–1988); Pride of Mississippi (1988–1991); Pride of Galveston (1991–2003)	Sank in 2003 off of the Dominican Republic, whilst on the way to the scrapyard at Alang, India.	SS Ryndam in 1951 Atlas arriving in Miami, 1974
SS Rhynland	1879	SS Rhyna (1906)	Scrapped in 1906	SS Rhynland in 1890
SS Roma (1926)	1926	SS Aquila (1939–1945)	Scuttled in Genoa on April 19, 1945, refloated and scrapped in La Spezia by 1952	CV Aquila in La Spezia, 1951
SS Rotterdam	1958	Rembrandt (1997–2003); Rotterdam (2003–)	Preserved as a hotelship in Rotterdam	Rotterdam as she looks now The Big Red Boat III with Rembrandt. Rembrandt is on the right
MS Ruahine	1950	Oriental Rio (1968–1974)	Scrapped at Kaohsiung, Taiwan in 1974	MV Ruahine
SS Saale	1886	J. L. Luckenbach (1901–1922); Princess (1922–1923); Madison (1923–24)	Scrapped in 1924	Saale in a 1895 painting
MS Sagafjord	1965	Gripsholm (1996–1997); Saga Rose (1997–2009)	Scrapped at Jiangyin, China in 2010	Sagafjord in Hamburg, 1969 Gripsholm in Southampton, 1996 Saga Rose in Warnemünde, 2009
SS Santa Paula (1932)	1932	SS Acropolis (1961–1971)	Scrapped in 1971	
SS Santa Paula (1958)	1958	Stella Polaris (1972–1978); Kuwait Marriott Hotel (1978–1989); Ramada al Salam Hotel (1989–1991)	Bombed in 1990 during the Iraqi occupation of Kuwait. Scrapped on site in 2002.	
SS Santa Rosa (1916)	1916	USAT Santa Rosa (1917–1919); USS Santa Rosa (1919); SS Oregonian (1925–1942)	Torpedoed in 1942	USS Santa Rosa in 1919
SS Santa Rosa (1932)	1932	SS Athinai (1961–1989)	Scrapped in 1989 at Aliaga, Turkey	S.S. Santa Rosa, 1932 Athinai laid up in Eleusis, 1986
RMS Saxonia (1954)	1954	RMS Carmania (1962–1973); SS Leonid Sobinov (1973–1999)	Scrapped at 1999 at Alang, India	Franconia and Carmania laid up in Southampton. Carmania is on the right. Leonid Sobinov in Istanbul, 1992
SS Scharnhorst (1904)	1904	La Bourdonnais (1920–1934)	Scrapped in 1934	
SS Scharnhorst (1934)	1934	Shin'yō (1942–1944)	Sank in the Yellow Sea on November 17, 1944, by the United States Navy submarine Spadefish	Scharnhorst in 1935 Scharnhorst after her conversion to Shin'yō
SS Shalom	1962	Hanseatic (1967–1973); Doric (1973–1981); Royal Odyssey (1981–1988); Regent Sun (1988–1996); Sun Venture (1996–1998); Sun (1998); Sun 11 (1998–2001)	Sank outside Cape St. Francis on July 26, 2001, while on the way to the scrapyard at Alang, India.	Shalom in 1967 Hanseatic in Hamburg, 1973 Doric in Kiel
RMS Slavonia	1902	SS Yamuna (1902–1903)	Wrecked June 10, 1909	The wrecked RMS Slavonia, June 10, 1909
MS Sobieski	1938	Gruziya (1950–1975)	Scrapped at La Spezia, Italy in 1975	HMS Sobieski in the River Clyde Gruziya in Helsinki
SS Southern Cross (1955)	1954	Calypso (1973–1980); Calypso I (1980–1981); Azure Seas (1981–1992); OceanBreeze (1992–2003)	Scrapped at Chittagong, Bangladesh in 2003	Southern Cross in the River Fal Azure Seas in Port Everglades, Florida 1991 OceanBreeze docked in Nassau, Bahamas, 2000
SS Spree	1890	Kaiserin Maria Theresia (1899–1904); Ural (1904–1905)	Sunk on 27 May 1905 during the Russo-Japanese War.	
SS Statendam (1956)	1956	Rhapsody (1982–1986); Regent Star (1986–1996); Sea Harmony (1996–2004); Harmony I (2004)	Scrapped at Alang, India in 2004	As Haven in 1972
TSS Stefan Batory	1952	Maasdam (1951–1968); Stefan (1990–2000)	Scrapped at Aliağa, Turkey in 2000	Stefan Batory
SS St. Louis (1894)	1894	USS Louisville (1918–1919)	Scrapped in 1924 at Genoa	SS St. Louis in 1900
MS Stockholm (1940)	1940	MS Sabaudia (1941–1944)	Bombed by British aircraft, and sank on July 6, 1944. Scrapped in 1949	Stockholm after her launch in 1940
SS Stockholm (1946)	1946	Völkerfreundschaft (1960–1985); Volker (1985–1986); Fridtjof Nansen (1986–1993); Italia I (1993–1994); Italia Prima (1994–1998); Valtur Prima (1998–2002); Caribe (2002–2005); Athena (2005–2013); Azores (2013–2016); Astoria (2016–2025)	Undergoing scrapping.	As Stockholm As the Völkerfreundschaft As Italia Prima in Genoa, 1994 As Athena in 2011 As Azores in 2014 As Astoria
SS Stratheden	1937	Henrietta Latsi (1963–1966); Marianna Latsi (1966–1969)	Scrapped in La Spezia, Italy in 1969	Stratheden in the Brisbane River
RMS Strathmore	1935	Marianna Latsi (1963–1966); Henrietta Latsi (1966–1969)	Scrapped at La Spezia, Italy in 1969	Strathmore in 1955
RMS Sylvania	1956	Fairwind (1968–1988); Sitmar Fairwind (1988); Dawn Princess (1988–1993); Albatros(1993–2003); Genoa (2003–2004)	Scrapped at Alang, India in 2004	Fairwind in Southampton, 1969 SS Albatros leaving Amsterdam, 2003
RMS Tahiti	1904	Port Kingston (1904–1911)	Sank from Propeller Shaft failure, August 17, 1930	RMS Port Kingston in 1904 The Tahiti sinking, 17 August 1930
SS The Emerald	1957	Santa Rosa (1958–1990); Diamond Island (1990–1992); Regent Rainbow (1992–1996); The Emerald (1996–2012)	Scrapped at Alang, India in 2012	The Emerald in Santo Domingo, Dominican Republic, 1999
SS Tuscania (1921)	1922	Nea Hellas (1939–1955); New York (1955–1961)	Scrapped in 1961	SS Tuscania underway
SS Uganda (1952)	1952	Triton (1986)	Wrecked in Kaohsiung, Taiwan during Typhoon Wayne on August 22, 1986. Scrapped on site in 1992.	Uganda in Helsinki, early 1980s Uganda laid up in River Fal, 1985
SS Vaderland (1900)	1900	Southland (1915–1917)	Torpedoed and sunk on June 4, 1917, by U-70	HMT Southland after being hit by a torpedo, 1915
SS Viet Nam	1951	Pacifique (1967–1970); Princess Abeto (1970–1971); Malaysia Baru (1971–1972); Malaysia Kita (1972–1976)	Caught fire and sank in Singapore on May 12, 1974. Scrapped in 1976 at Kaohsiung, Taiwan	
MS Vistafjord	1972	Caronia (1999–2004); Saga Ruby (2004–2014); Oasia (2014–2017)	Scrapped at Alang, India in 2017	Vistafjord in Hamburg, 1973 Vistafjord docked in Piraeus, 1984 Vistafjord in Hamburg, 1984 Caronia in 2003 Saga Ruby in 2013
MS Vulcania	1926	Caribia (1965–1973)	Sank on March 15, 1973, whilst under tow to Kaohsiung, Taiwan for scrap	Vulcania in 1948
SS Washington	1932	USS Mount Vernon (1941–1946)	Scrapped in 1965	SS Washington in New York USS Mount Vernon at sea
SS Westernland	1918	RMS Regina (1918-1929)	Scrapped in 1947	RMS Regina in Dominion Line livery SS Westernland
RMS Windsor Castle (1959)	1959	Margarita L (1977–2004); Rita(2004–2005)	Scrapped at Alang, India in 2005	Windsor Castle in 1960
MV Yaohua	1967	Orient Princess (1987–)	Floating tourist attraction in Binhai, Tianjin, China	Orient Princess in Tianjin
SS Zeeland (1900)	1900	SS Northland (1915–1919); SS Minnesota (1927–1930)	Scrapped at 1930 at Inverkeithing, Scotland	SS Zeeland
SS Zealandic	1911	HMT Zealandic (1914–1918); SS Zealandic (1918–1926); SS Mamillius (1926–1936); SS Mamari III(1936–1939); HMS Fleet Tender C(1939–1941)	Struck a sunken wreck off Cromer on 3 June 1941 and then torpedoed by E-boat.	SS Zealandic in 1923 Mamari III, disguised as Hermes with a false flight deck and island
SS Zeppelin	1915	USS Zeppelin (1919); RMS Ormuz (1919–1927); SS Dresden (1927–1934)	Ran aground on 20 June 1934, scrapped on sight.	Zeppelin in 1919

== See also ==
- List of cruise ships
- Timeline of largest passenger ships
