= RMS Empress of India (1890) =

Ocean Liner

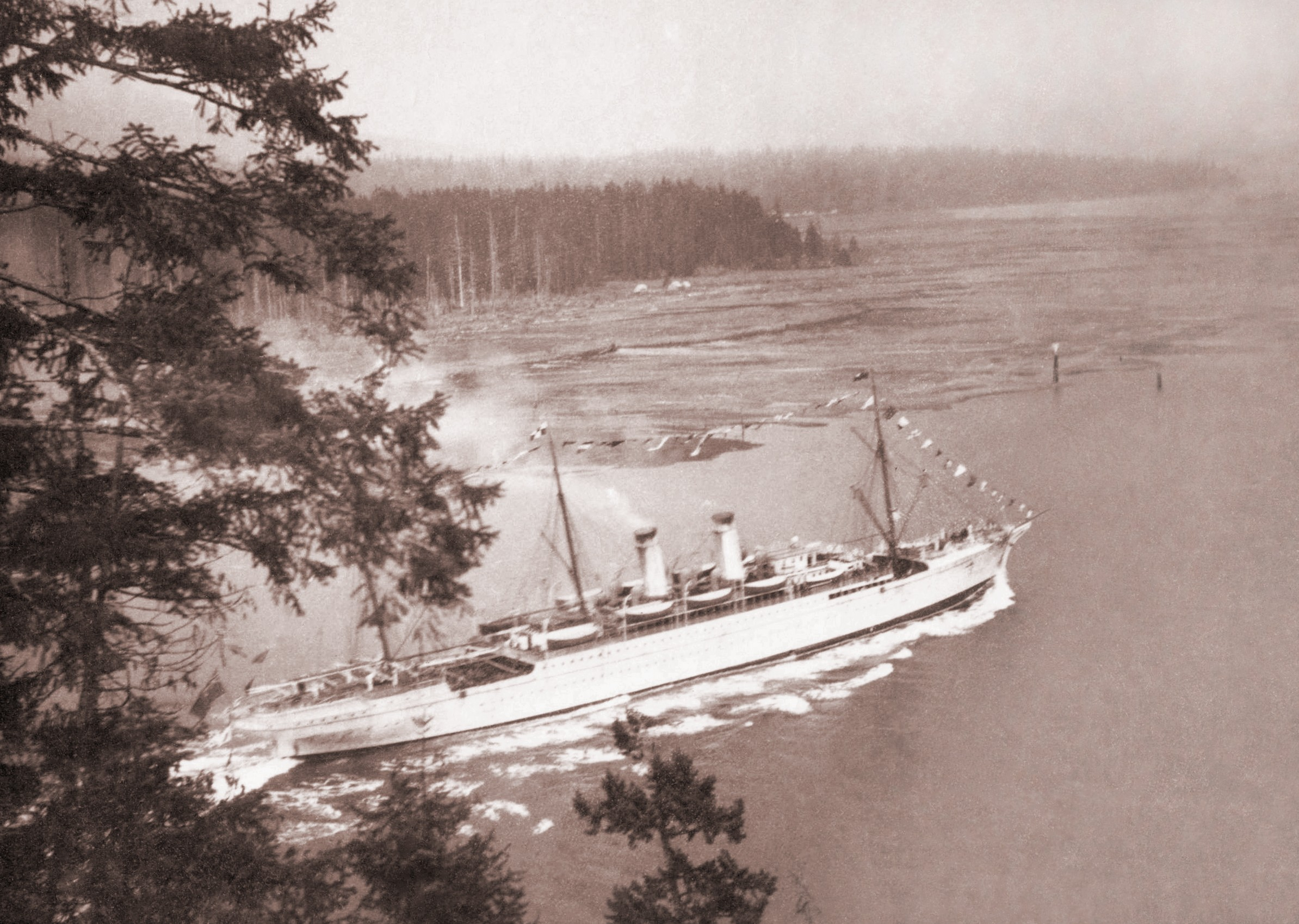
- Empress of India departing Vancouver.

History
- Name: 1891-1914: Empress of India; 1915-1923 Loyalty
- Owner: 1891-1914: Canadian Pacific Railway; 1914-1919: Maharaja of Gwalior; 1919-1923: Scindia Steam Navigation
- Port of registry: 1891-1914: London; 1914-1923: Bombay
- Route: Pacific (Vancouver - Yokohama - Kobe - Nagasaki - Shanghai - Hong Kong)
- Builder: Naval Construction & Armaments Co, Barrow-in-Furness
- Laid down: 1890
- Launched: 30 August 1890 by Lady Louisa Egerton
- Maiden voyage: 8 February 1891
- Fate: Scrapped in 1923

General characteristics
- Type: Ocean liner
- Tonnage: 5,700 tons
- Length: (Overall) 485ft (147.83m); (Between Perpendiculars) 440ft (134.12m)
- Beam: 51 ft (15.54 m)
- Propulsion: Twin propellers
- Speed: 16 knots
- Capacity: As originally configured: 120 first class, 50 second class and 600 steerage

RMS Empress of India was an ocean liner built in 1890-1891 by Naval Construction & Armaments Co, Barrow-in-Furness, England for Canadian Pacific Steamships. This ship would be the first of two CP vessels to be named Empress of India, and on 28 April 1891, she was the first of many ships named Empress arriving at Vancouver harbor.

Empress of India regularly traversed the trans-Pacific route between the west coast of Canada and the Far East until she was sold to the Maharajah of Gwalior in 1914 and renamed in 1915.

In 1891, Canadian Pacific Railway (CPR) and the British government reached agreement on a contract for subsidized mail service between Britain and Hong Kong via Canada; and the route began to be serviced by three specially designed ocean liners. Each of these three vessels was given an Imperial name.

Empress of India and her two running mates—RMS Empress of China and RMS Empress of Japan—created a flexible foundation for the CPR trans-Pacific fleet which would ply this route for the next half century.

== History ==
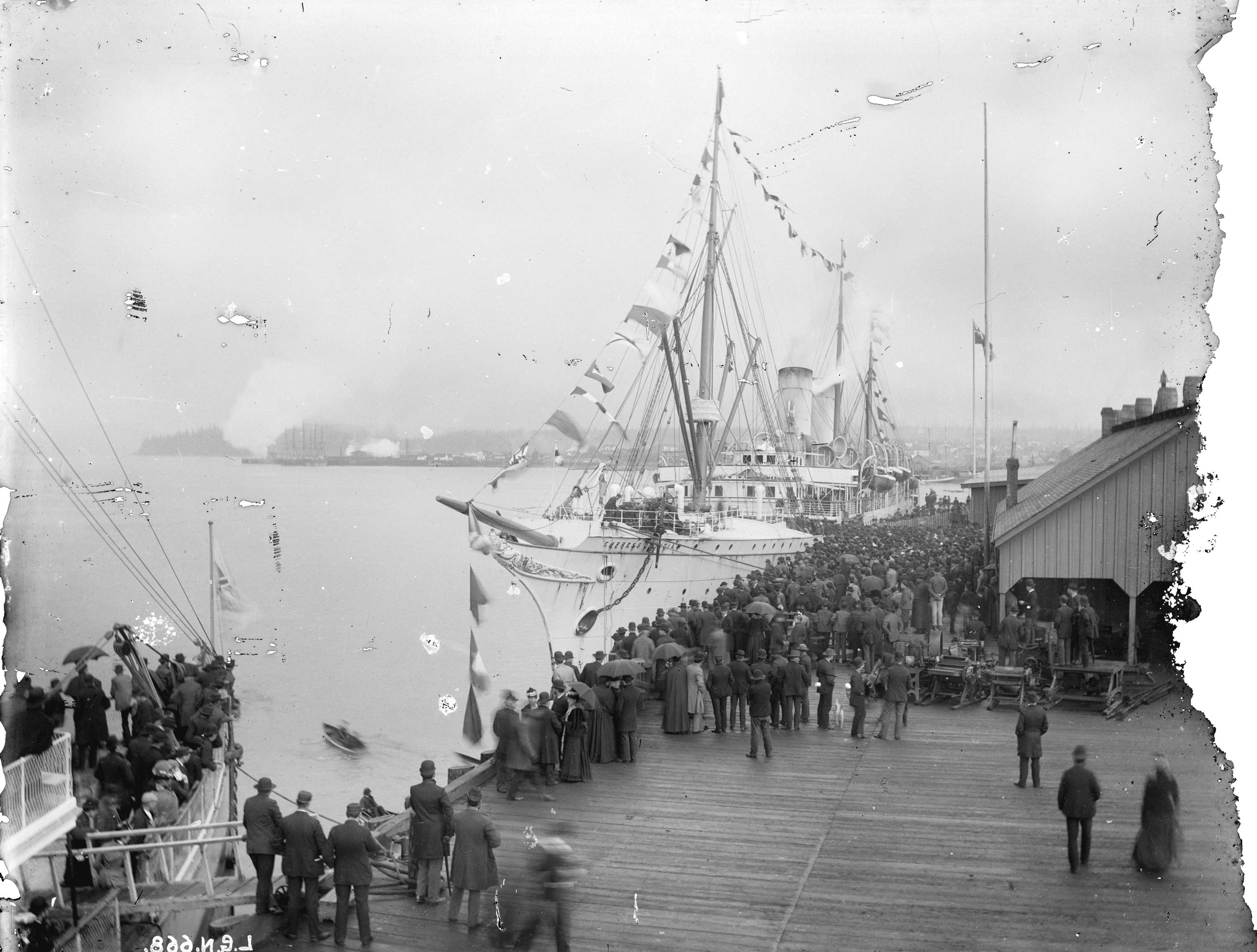
Empress of India arriving at Vancouver.

Empress of India was built by Naval Construction & Armaments Co. (now absorbed into Vickers Armstrongs) at Barrow, England. The keel was laid in 1890. She was launched on 30 August 1890 by Lady Louisa Egerton, wife of Admiral Hon. Francis Egerton and sister of Lord Hartington, chairman of the shipbuilders.

The 5,905-ton vessel had a length of 455.6 feet, and her beam was 51.2 feet. The graceful white-painted, clipper-bowed ship had two buff-colored funnels with a band of black paint at the top, three lightweight schooner-type masts, and an average speed of 16-knots. Empress of India and her running mate Empresses were the first vessels in the Pacific to have twin propellers with reciprocating engines. The ship was designed to provide accommodation for 770 passengers (120 first class, 50 second class and 600 steerage).

Empress of India left Liverpool on 8 February 1891 on her maiden voyage via Suez to Hong Kong and Vancouver. Thereafter, she regularly sailed back and forth along the Hong Kong - Shanghai - Nagasaki - Kobe - Yokohama - Vancouver route. In the early days of wireless telegraphy, the call sign established for Empress of India was "MPI."

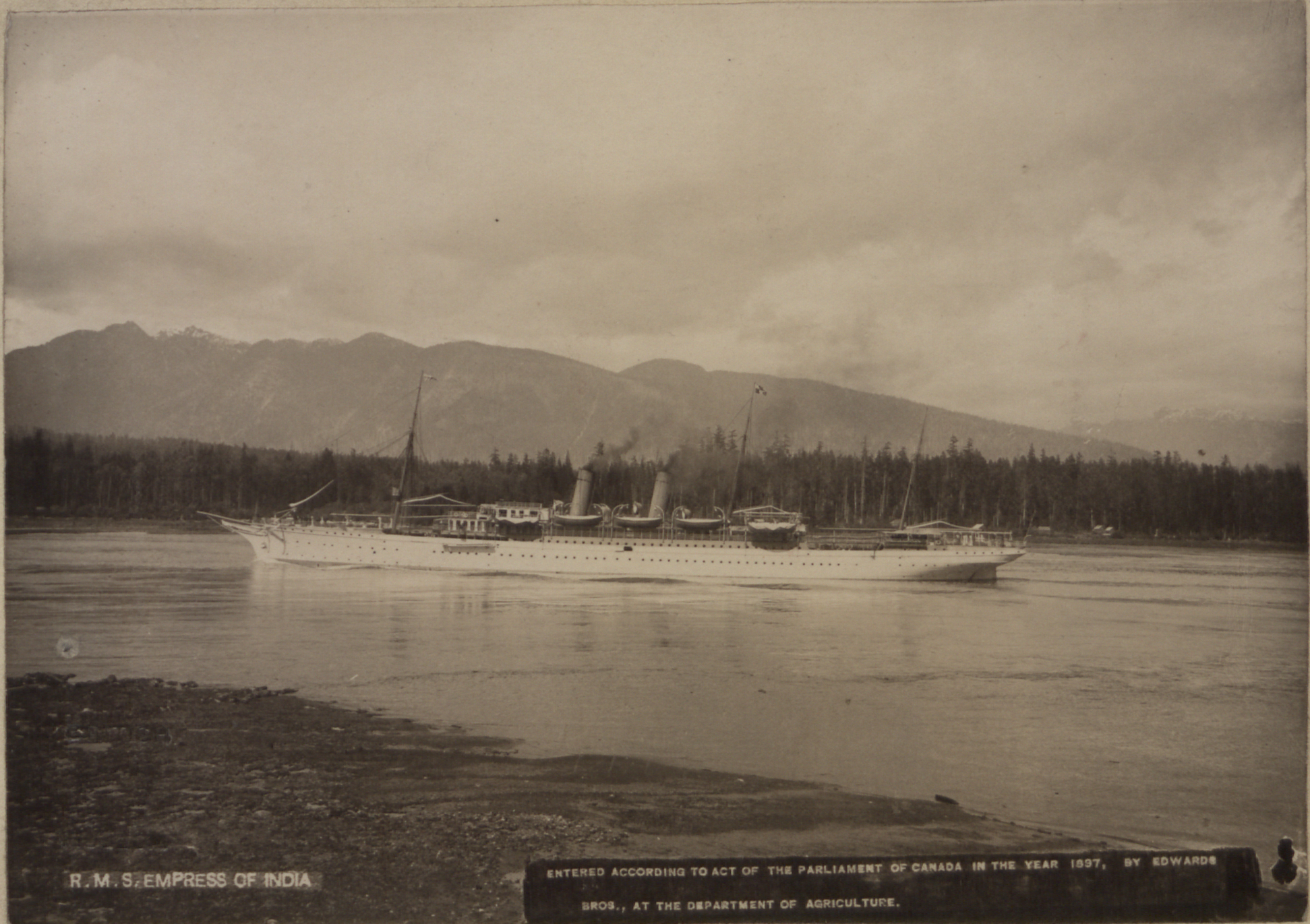
RMS Empress of India leaving Vancouver Harbour, 1896

Much of what would have been construed as ordinary, even unremarkable during this period was an inextricable part of the ship's history. In the conventional course of trans-Pacific traffic, the ship was sometimes held in quarantine, as when it was discovered that a passenger from Hong Kong to Kobe showed signs of smallpox, and the vessel was held in Yokohama port until the incubation period for the disease had passed. The cargo holds of the Empress would have been routinely examined in the normal course of harbor-master's business in Hong Kong, Yokohama or Vancouver.

On 17 August 1903, Empress of India collided with and sank the Chinese cruiser Huang Tai.

The vessel was reported sold on 19 December 1914, to Scindia of Gwalior (also known as the Maharajah of Gwalior). The former Empress was re-fitted as a hospital ship for Indian troops. On 19 January 1915, the ship was renamed Loyalty. In March 1919, she was sold to The Scindia Steam Navigation Company Ltd. Company in Bombay (now Mumbai). In February 1923, the ship was sold for scrapping at Bombay.

CP Empresses of India
In 1921, Canadian Pacific added two German-built vessels to Empress fleet; and initially, both were confusingly renamed Empress of China. Within months, one of these ships will be renamed Empress of India and the other will be renamed the Empress of Australia. A quick explanation will help distinguish these quite different ships which each sailed with the same name.

- The first SS Empress of India was a 5,905-ton vessel, launched in 1890 from Barrow, England. The Empress would be sold in 1914, renamed SS Loyalty in 1915, and scrapped in Bombay in 1919.
  - A CP sister-ship, the first SS Empress of China, was also a Barrow-built, 5,905-ton vessel; but was launched a few months later, in 1891. The ship was later wrecked on a reef at Tokyo Bay in 1911, and subsequently scrapped in 1912.
- The second SS Empress of India was a 16,992-ton vessel launched in 1907 from Geestemunde, Germany as the SS Prince Freidrich Wilhelm. The ship was purchased in 1921 by Canadian Pacific and then immediately, the ship was renamed Empress of China for only a short time.
  - This second SS Empress of China and of India would be renamed several more times—as SS Montlaurier in 1922; and as SS Montnairn in 1925. The ship was scrapped 1929.

This vessel from Barrow is the first of two CP ships named Empress of India.

== See also ==
- CP Ships
- List of ocean liners
- List of ships in British Columbia
