= RMS Empress of Japan (1890) =

Canadian ocean liner

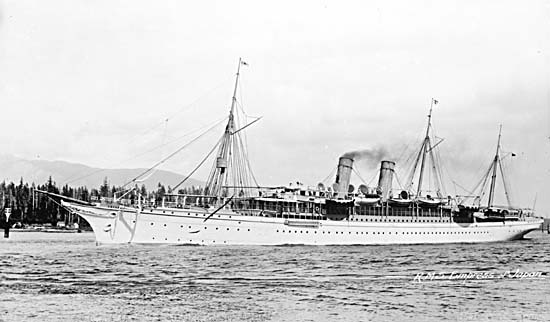
- Empress of Japan

History

Canada
- Name: Empress of Japan
- Owner: Canadian Pacific Steamship Company
- Port of registry: Canada
- Route: Pacific (Vancouver - Yokohama - Kobe - Nagasaki - Shanghai - Hong Kong)
- Builder: Naval Construction & Armaments Co, Barrow-in-Furness
- Launched: 13 December 1890 by Lady Alice Stanley
- Out of service: 1922
- Fate: Scrapped in 1926

General characteristics
- Type: Ocean liner
- Tonnage: 5,700 tons
- Length: (Overall) 485ft (147.83m); (Between Perpendiculars) 440ft (134.12m)
- Beam: 51 ft (15.54 m)
- Propulsion: twin propellers
- Speed: 16 knots
- Capacity: 160 1st class passengers; 40 2nd class; up to 700-steerage passengers

RMS Empress of Japan, also known as the "Queen of the Pacific", was an ocean liner built in 1890–1891 by Naval Construction & Armaments Co, Barrow-in-Furness, England for Canadian Pacific Steamships (CP). This ship – the first of two CP vessels to be named Empress of Japan – regularly traversed the trans-Pacific route between the west coast of Canada and the Far East until 1922. During the First World War she served as armed merchant cruiser, becoming HMS Empress of Japan for the period that she was a commissioned ship of the Royal Navy.

Over the course of her career, Empress of Japan traversed 4 million kilometres (2.5 million miles). She made 315 Pacific crossings.

In 1891, Canadian Pacific Railway (CPR) and the British government reached agreement on a contract for subsidized mail service between Britain and Hong Kong via Canada; and the route began to be serviced by three specially designed ocean liners. Each of these three vessels was given an Imperial name.

Empress of Japan and her two running mates – RMS Empress of China and the RMS Empress of India – created a flexible foundation for the CPR trans-Pacific fleet which would ply this route for the next half century.

== History ==
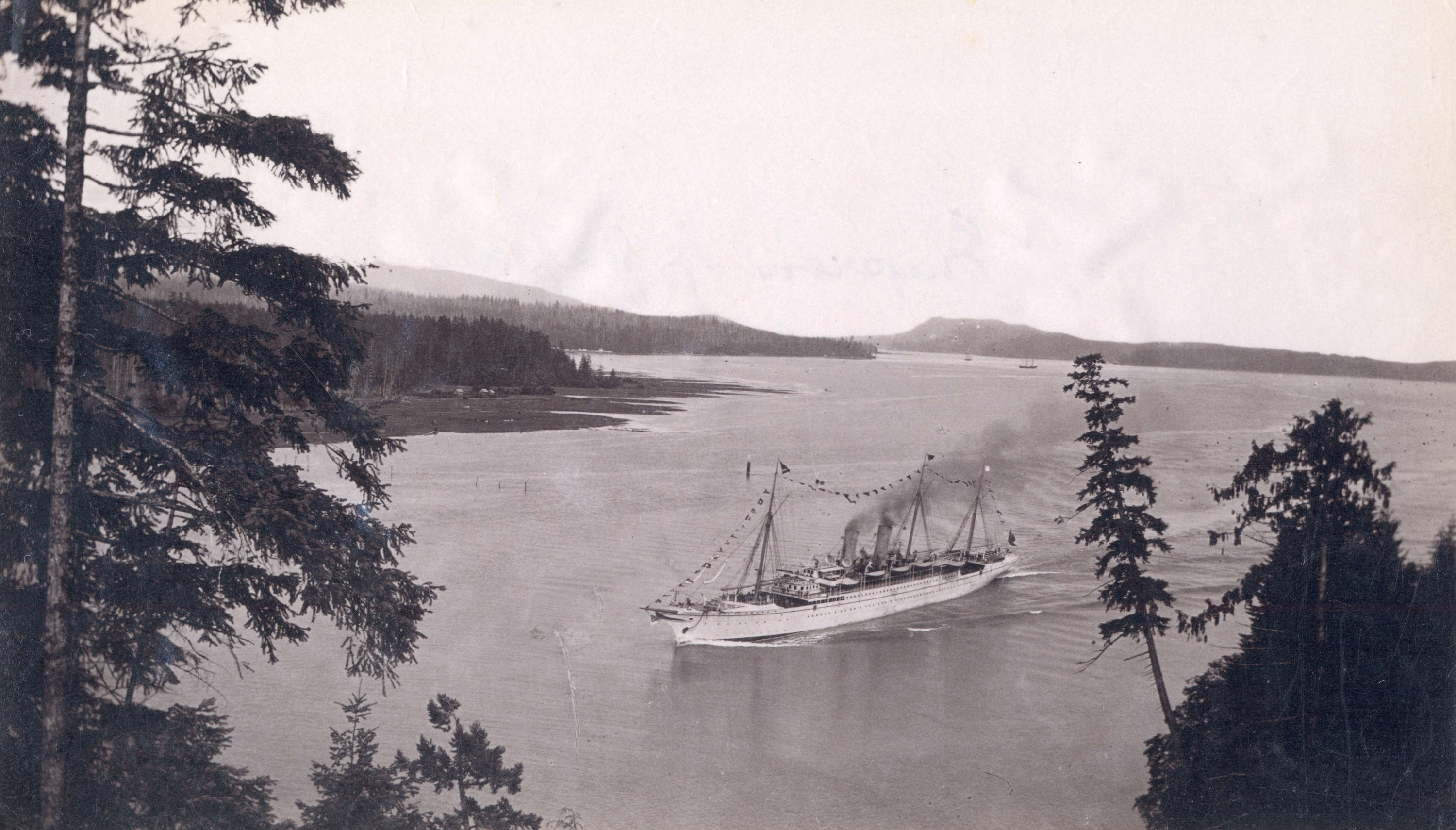
Empress of Japan leaves Vancouver Harbour in 1893.

Empress of Japan was built by Naval Construction & Armaments Co. (now absorbed into Vickers Armstrongs) at Barrow-in-Furness, England. The 5,905-ton vessel had a length of 455.6 feet (138.9 m), and her beam was 51.2 feet (15.6 m). The white-painted, clipper-bowed ship had two buff-colored funnels with a band of black paint at the top, three lightweight schooner-type masts, and an average speed of 16-knots. Empress of Japan and her two sister-ships were the first vessels in the Pacific to have twin propellers with reciprocating engines. The ship was designed to provide accommodation for 770 passengers (120 first class, 50 second class and 600 steerage).

She was launched on 13 December 1890 by Lady Alice Stanley, daughter-in-law of Lord Stanley, who was then the Governor General of Canada. The ship left Liverpool on 11 April 1891 on her maiden voyage via Suez to Hong Kong and Vancouver, arriving in British Columbia on 2 June. Thereafter, she regularly sailed the route between Canada and the east coast of Asia. In the early days of wireless telegraphy, the call sign established for the Empress of Japan was "MPJ." It also transported passengers and cargo, notably Japanese tea.

Captained by Captain Henry Pybus, Empress of Japan won blue ribbon for record crossing of the Trans-Pacific crossing of 1897. The ship remained in active trans-Pacific service until 1922; and then she remained harbor-bound in Vancouver for several years. The dragon figurehead has been preserved at the Seawall in Stanley Park

=== World War I ===
Empress of Japan was refitted as an Armed merchantman during the Great War; and consequently, she lost the elegant white gleam associated with luxury cruise ships. The agreement of commission between Canadian Pacific Railway, the Canadian Federal Government and the British Parliament included a clause which stated that in the event of war, Empress of Japan would be re-fitted to meet Admiralty requirements. In 1914, two days before Empress of Japan arrived in Yokohama on a routine trip to Asia, World War I broke out in Europe. His Majesty's Admiralty acted swiftly to take advantage of the wartime commissioning clause, and Empress of Japan was re-fitted. During the war years, SS Empress of Japan was also refitted as an Armed Merchant Cruiser. After the Armistice, this ship was the only one of the first three Empress ocean liners to return to the trans-Pacific route.

In 1923, the war-weary ship was used in a different kind of battle when Canadian Pacific used the aging Empress of Japan to house strikebreakers in a dispute with the Vancouver and District Waterfront Workers' Association. The ship remained moored in Vancouver's harbor until 1926.

The CP eventually replaced the Empress with a new vessel, which was also called Empress of Japan.

=== Salvage ===
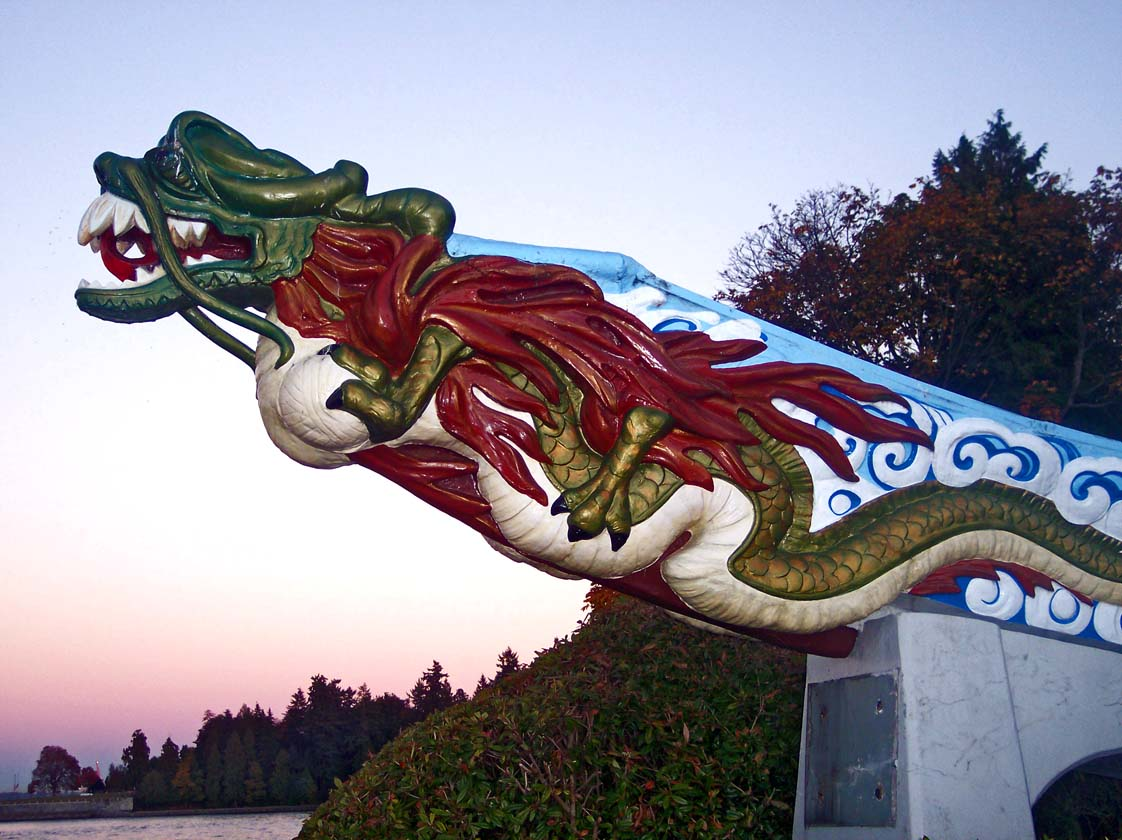
Replica of Empress of Japan figurehead in Vancouver's Stanley Park.

The figurehead was rescued after being discarded during the salvage of Empress of Japan by the Vancouver Daily Province newspaper. It was restored and in 1927 was mounted for public display in Vancouver's Stanley Park.

That figurehead was itself replaced in 1960 with a fiberglass replica, as the original was beginning to deteriorate. The original figurehead has been once again restored and is now housed at the Vancouver Maritime Museum as part of its permanent collection.

Various portions of the ship's once lavish interior were also scavenged by local homeowners from Vancouver's wealthiest neighbourhoods and added to their homes and property values.

== See also ==
- CP Ships
- List of ocean liners
- List of ships in British Columbia
- List of attractions and monuments in Stanley Park
- Samuel Robinson, junior officer (1895), captain
