= Samuel Robinson (sea captain) =

British merchant navy officer

Commander Samuel Robinson CBE RD RNR
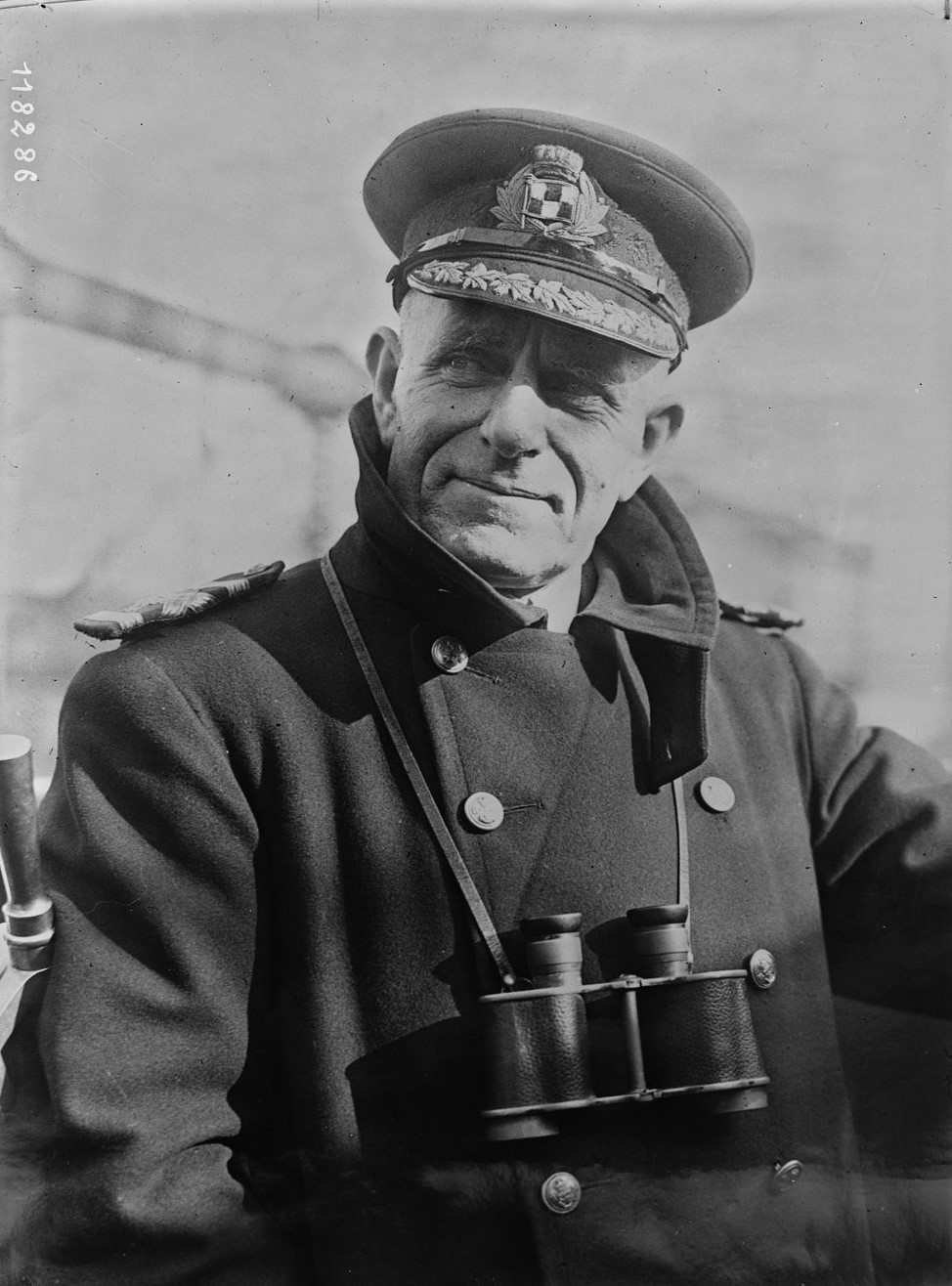
- Robinson in 1927
- Born: 8 May 1870; Kingston upon Hull, East Riding of Yorkshire, England
- Died: 5 September 1958 (aged 88); Vancouver, British Columbia, Canada
- Resting place: Forest Lawn Memorial Park, Burnaby, British Columbia, Canada
- Occupations: Merchant seaman, Naval officer
- Spouse: Jessie Nichols Reeves (m. 1901)
- Military career
- Allegiance: United Kingdom
- Branch: Royal Naval Reserve
- Rank: Commander
- Conflicts: World War I
- Awards: Order of the British Empire; Reserve Decoration

Commander Samuel Robinson CBE RD RNR (8 May 1870 – 5 September 1958) was a British-Canadian merchant seaman and naval officer who was best known for his rescue efforts in the aftermath of the 1923 Great Kantō earthquake.

Robinson was a Commander in the British Royal Naval Reserve, and a captain in the fleet of the Canadian Pacific Steamship Ocean Service during the period spanning the first three decades of the 20th century. He was also one of only three living non-Imperial Family members to have received the Grand Cordon of the Order of the Chrysanthemum, Japan's highest order, for participating in rescue operations in the aftermath of the 1923 earthquake.

== Career ==
The Pacific fleet of the Canadian Pacific Railway tended to hire its officers from the Royal Naval Reserves, and much was made of their long and faithful service to the company. Although Robinson's job description was "Captain," his title was "Commander" because he had earned that rank during his service in the Royal Naval Reserve. During World War I, Robinson captained the Empress of Asia which transported American troops from New York to Southampton, England.

=== Canadian Pacific ===
In his 48 years at sea, 37 were with the Canadian Pacific steamships, from 1895 to 1932. Robinson served on a number of vessels. He was captain of two ships with the same name—the 1891 Empress of Japan and the 1930 Empress of Japan—and he was captain of the first of three ships to be named Empress of Canada. His career at sea included sailing on the following:

- RMS Empress of Japan, junior officer (1895), captain
- RMS Empress of China, chief officer (1899)
- RMS Empress of Asia, captain (1913)
- RMS Empress of Russia, captain (1917)
- RMS Empress of Australia, captain (1922)
- RMS Empress of Canada, captain (1924)
- RMS Empress of Japan, captain (1930)

Robinson was a junior officer on the Empress of Japan in 1895. He became the chief officer on the Empress of China in 1899, and then captain of the Empress of Japan. He was transferred in 1913 to become the captain of the Empress of Asia. In May 1914, he pushed the Empress of Asia and her crew in setting a new world's record for both a single day's steaming (473 nautical miles) and for crossing the Pacific (nine days, two hours, and fifteen minutes). In 1917, he took command of the Empress of Russia. When the Empress of Australia was added to the Canadian Pacific fleet, he was made her first captain. When the Empress of Japan was added to the fleet in 1930, Robinson was given command.

== Great Kantō earthquake ==
When the 1923 Great Kantō earthquake struck Yokohama at a little after noon on 1 September 1923, Captain Robinson was aboard the Empress of Australia. He was finalising routine preparations for a scheduled departure later in the day; but the greatest natural disaster in modern times was about to reorder those priorities. He would be credited with saving the ship, his crew and passengers, and more than 3,000 others during the unfolding catastrophe.

The Empress of Australia earned international acclaim and recognition for her captain because it was the ship which was able to offer the most help in evacuating the devastated metropolis of Tokyo. In the chaos which developed after the ground stopped shaking, Robinson kept his ship near the quay at Yokohama in Tokyo Bay for the next twelve days, providing such help as he and his crew were able to offer.

The ship remained anchored off Yokohama for several days, and then she sailed for the port of Kobe laden with refugees.

Robinson's own contributions were minimized in the report he prepared for the Canadian Pacific home office. He displayed a seemly modesty in this summary:

"One of the most gratifying things, and the dominant factor in the whole proceedings is that everyone with whom we have had to deal on board has worked together without friction, disagreement, or complaint during this terrible catastrophe ... some of the hardest workers having lost families or homes or business possessions, and in some cases all of these."

A group of passengers and refugees who were aboard during the disaster commissioned a bronze tablet and presented it to the ship in recognition of the relief efforts. When the Empress of Australia was scrapped in 1952, the bronze tablet was rescued. It was formally presented to Captain Robinson, then aged 82, in a special ceremony in Vancouver.

== Personal life ==
He was born in Kingston upon Hull, England, on 8 May 1870, and went to sea as an apprentice at age 14. He travelled to Canada in the early 1890s, hoping to find gold in the Similkameen area of British Columbia. Unsuccessful, Robinson resumed his nautical career with the Canadian Pacific Line and ended up settling in Vancouver.

In 1901, Robinson married Jessie Nichols Reeves at the Anglican Church in Yokohama, Japan. They had no children.

Robinson died in Vancouver on 5 September 1958. He was buried in Forest Lawn Memorial Park in Burnaby, British Columbia. His widow Jessie died in 1960 and was buried next to him.

== Honours ==
- Commander of the Order of the British Empire (CBE).
- Grand Cordon of the Supreme Order of the Chrysanthemum (Japan).
- Order of St John of Jerusalem, the Silver Medal (UK).
- Lloyd's Medal for Meritorious Service (UK).
- Medal of Honour with Red Ribbon (Japan).
- Order of the White Elephant (Siam).
- Cross of the Second Class of the Order of Naval Merit (with white badge) (Spain)
