= RMS Empress of China (1890) =

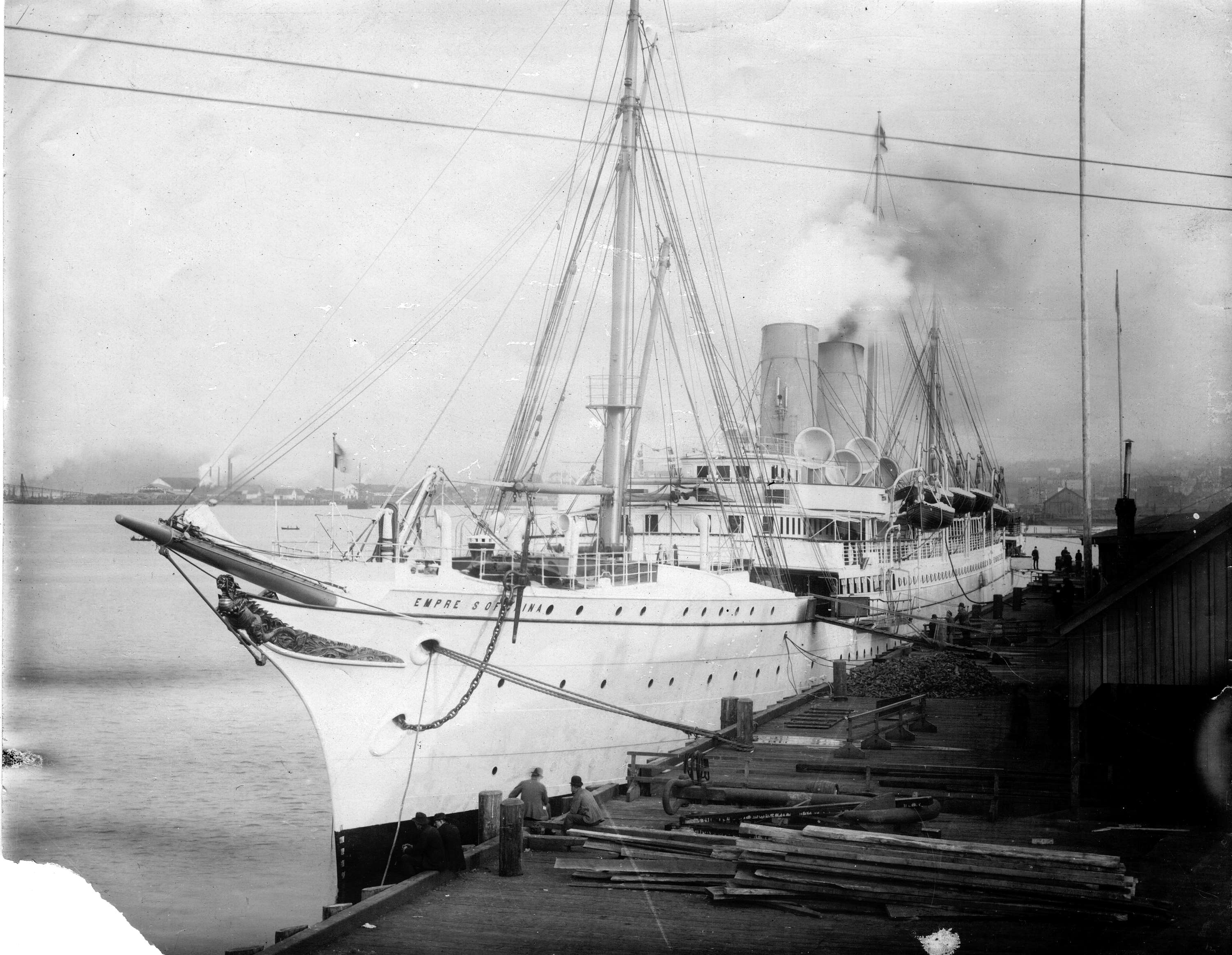
- C.P.R. steamer Empress of China at docks. Vancouver, BC, Canada.

History

Canada
- Name: 1891-1913: Empress of China
- Owner: 1891-1912: Canada Canadian Pacific Railway
- Port of registry: 1891-1912: Canada
- Route: Pacific (Vancouver - Yokohama - Kobe - Nagasaki - Shanghai - Hong Kong)
- Builder: Naval Construction & Armament Co., Barrow
- Laid down: 1890
- Launched: 25 March 1890
- Maiden voyage: 15 July 1891
- Fate: Scrapped in 1912, Yokohama

General characteristics
- Type: Ocean liner
- Tonnage: 5,700 tons
- Length: (Overall) 485ft (147.83m); (Between Perpendiculars) 440ft (134.12m)
- Beam: 51 ft (15.54 m)
- Propulsion: twin propellers
- Speed: 16 knots
- Capacity: 120 1st class passengers; 50 2nd class; up to 600 steerage passengers

RMS Empress of China was an ocean liner built in 1890-1891 by Naval Construction & Armament Co., Barrow, England for Canadian Pacific Steamships (CP). This ship—the first of three CP vessels to be named Empress of China—regularly traversed the trans-Pacific route between the west coast of Canada and the Far East until she struck an underwater reef and sank in Tokyo harbour in 1911.

== Royal Mail Ship ==
In 1891, Canadian Pacific Railway (CPR) and the British government signed a contract for subsidized mail service between Britain and Hong Kong via Canada. The route was first served by three specially designed ocean liners. Each vessel was given an imperial name.

Empress of China and her running mates, RMS Empress of India and RMS Empress of Japan, created a flexible foundation for the CPR trans-Pacific fleet that would ply this route for the next half-century.

== History ==
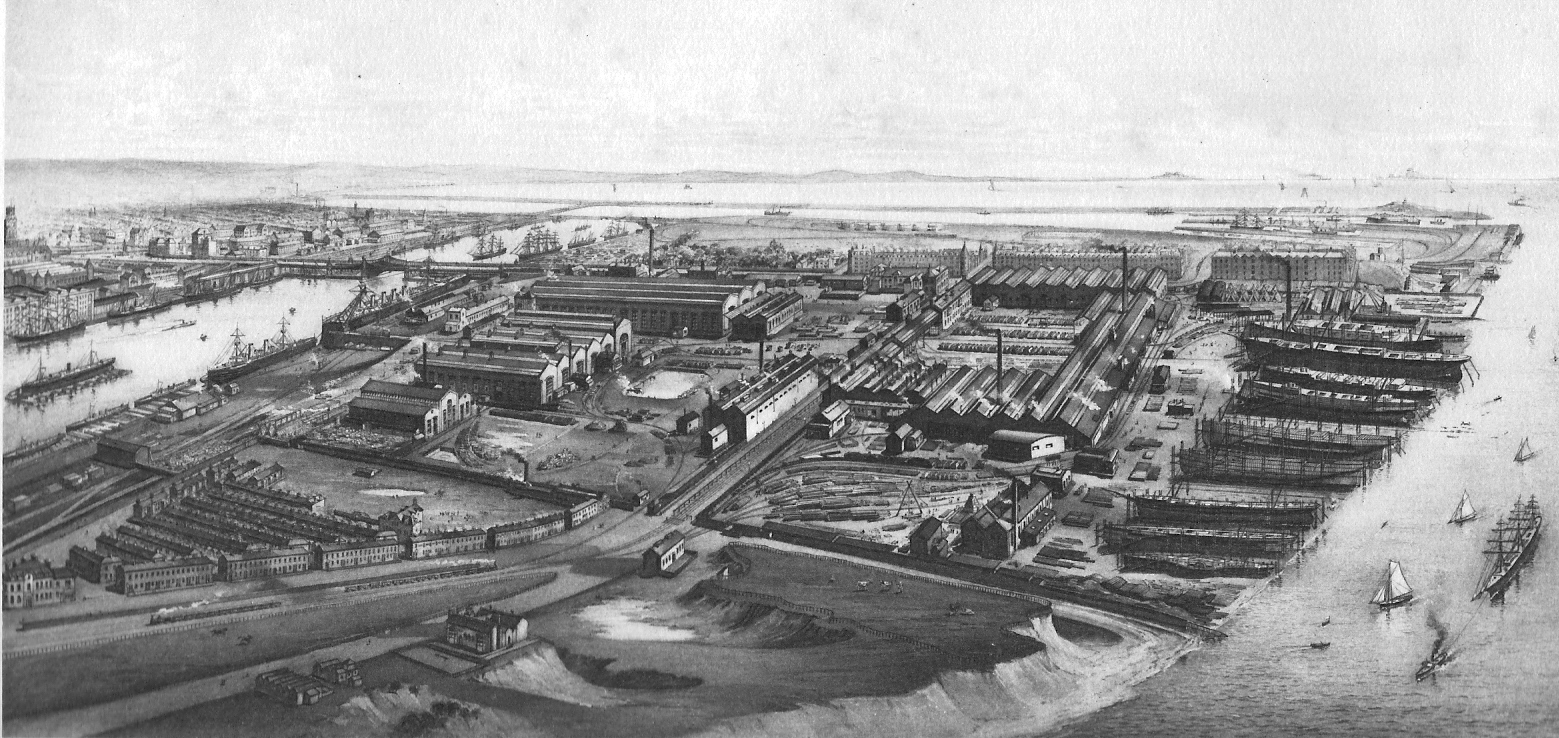
Barrow-in-Furness, shipbuilding yards (1890).

Empress of China was built by Naval Construction & Armament Co. (now absorbed into Vickers Armstrongs) at Barrow, England. The keel was laid in 1890; and she was launched on 25 March 1891.

The 5,905-ton vessel had a length of 455.6 feet, and her beam was 51.2 feet. The graceful white-painted, clipper-bowed ship had two buff-coloured funnels with a band of black paint at the top, three lightweight schooner-type masts, and an average speed of 16-knots. This Empress and her two sister-ship Empresses were the first vessels in the Pacific to have twin propellers with reciprocating engines. The ship was designed to provide accommodation for 770 passengers (120 first class, 50 second class and 600 steerage).

Empress of China left Liverpool on 15 July 1891 on her maiden voyage via Suez to Hong Kong and Vancouver. Thereafter, she regularly sailed the route between Canada and the east coast of Asia. In the early days of wireless telegraphy, the call sign established for Empress of China was "MPG."

Much of what would have been construed as ordinary, even unremarkable during this period was an inextricable part of the ship's history. In the conventional course of trans-Pacific traffic, the ship was sometimes held in quarantine, as when it was discovered that a passenger from Hong Kong to Yokohama showed signs of smallpox, and the vessel was held in Yokohama port until the incubation period for the disease had passed. The cargo holds of the Empress would have been routinely examined in the normal course of harbor-master's business in Hong Kong, Yokohama or Vancouver.

Amongst the celebrities sailing on Empress of China was Archduke Franz Ferdinand of Austria. On 25 August 1893, the Archduke boarded the ocean liner at Yokohama for a voyage across the Pacific to Vancouver. William Lyon Mackenzie King, who eventually became the longest-serving prime minister in Canadian History, "saw over" the ship on Friday, 22 November 1901 as part of his visit to Vancouver as deputy minister of the newly formed Department of Labour.

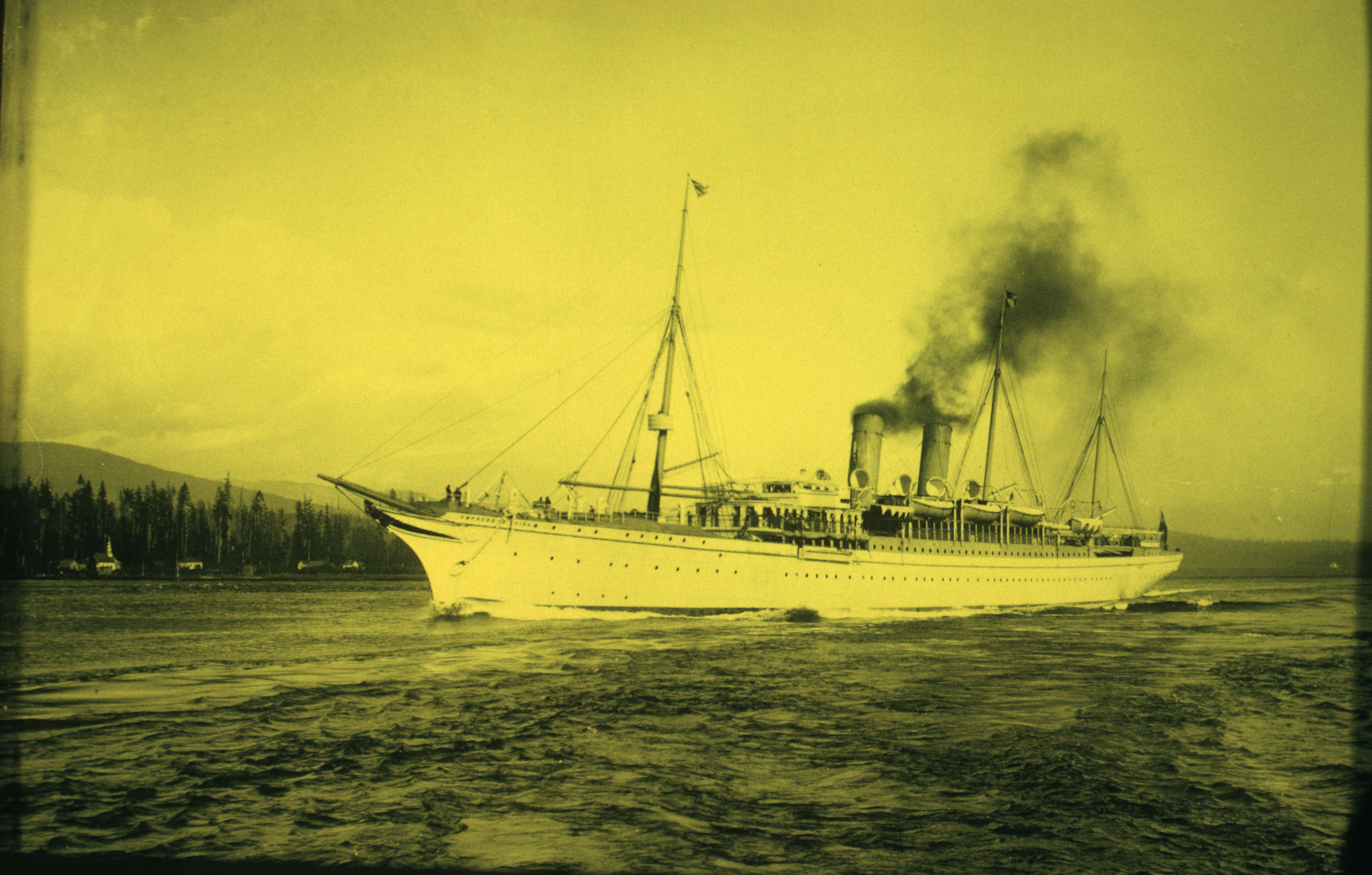
RMS Empress of China in 1904

On 27 July 1911 Empress of China encountered rough seas and thick fog 65 miles south of Tokyo Bay. She struck a submerged rock off the Nojimazaki Lighthouse while trying to round the southern tip of the Bōsō Peninsula inbound for Yokohama. Submerged rocks extend about a mile from the coast in an area of the bay which is known for its dangerous currents. This accident occurred very close to where another ship foundered on the rocks in 1907. The Japanese cruisers Aso and Soya were dispatched to assist in removing mail, baggage, and passengers. The ship was abandoned with no loss of life. A year later, the Empress was re-floated; and in October 1912, she was towed into Yokohama where she was dismantled and scrapped.

CP Empresses of China
In 1921, Canadian Pacific added two German-built vessels to the Empress fleet; and initially, both were confusingly renamed Empress of China.

- The first Empress of China was a 5,905-ton vessel launched in 1891 from Barrow, England. She was wrecked on a reef at Tokyo Bay in 1911, and subsequently scrapped in 1912.
- The second SS Empress of China was a 16,992-ton vessel launched in 1907 from Gestemunde, Germany as the SS Prince Friedrich Wilhelm for the Norddeutscher Lloyd Line (NDL). The ship was purchased in 1921 by Canadian Pacific and then immediately, the ship was renamed Empress of China for a short time. Later in that same year, the ship was renamed yet again as the Empress of India. Subsequent names for this vessel were: the SS Montlaurier (1922); and SS Montnairn (1925). The ship was scrapped 1929.
- The third SS Empress of China was a 21,860-ton vessel launched in 1913 from Stettin, Germany, as the SS Tirpitz for Hamburg-America Line (HAPAG). The ship was purchased in 1921 by CP and renamed the Empress of China. Then next year, in 1922, the ship was renamed Empress of Australia after re-fitting at Clydebank. The ship was ultimately scrapped in 1952.

== See also ==
- CP Ships
- List of ocean liners
- List of ships in British Columbia
- Samuel Robinson, chief officer (1899)
