= Cruise book =

Yearbook-style publication of the US Navy

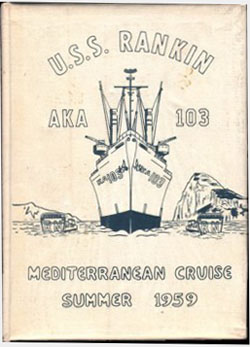
A typical cruise book from the past

A cruise book is a yearbook-style publication often produced by ships of the United States Navy upon completion of a long deployment (typically six months or more). The books typically contain photos of all the people who were aboard during the cruise, usually grouped by their division or department. There are often candid photos as well, showing the people at work aboard the ship. Often there is a map or a description of the ship's travels during the cruise, and there are pictures taken at the various ports of call.

On large ships, the books are produced on board by the ship's Morale, Welfare and Recreation department and Public Affairs staff, later they are printed ashore by printing companies that specialize in such services. The cruise book of a Nimitz-class aircraft carrier typically reaches over 600 pages in length, as it includes portraits of the more than 5,000 sailors and U.S. Marines assigned to the ship's company and embarked carrier air wing.

Cruise books of smaller ships are typically much smaller, often 50–100 pages, and are produced informally by volunteers. They are printed ashore by the same companies that specialize in cruise book publication firms that also handle the larger ships.

USMC units also have a long-standing tradition of doing cruise books for deployments. Many units do so remotely from their deployed location, allowing them to proof the books prior to final printing. This is usually done by allowing the publisher to maintain a website where the pages are displayed to be viewed by anyone in the unit and then giving feedback.

The Navy Department Library has a collection of over 8,000 cruise books and similar Navy yearbooks, dating from the Spanish–American War to the present. Cruise books from many Seabee units are included in the collection. The Navy Department Library accepts donations of cruise books from all time periods.

Private collectors exist throughout the world, with an example being a site run by Retired Command Master Chief Dillard. He has been collecting these books since the 1970s and is attempting to document every USN/USCG ship cruise book ever published. So far, he has determined that there have been at least 7,844 ship cruise books published. He has managed to have documented 3,965 of them and collected scans of the front covers of 5,797 of these cruise books. In addition to having 1,970 ship cruise books in his personal collection, he also has over 4,000 individual ship files—roughly seven file cabinets full—containing photos and other historical data.
