= MV Reina del Pacifico =

Ocean liner of the Pacific Steam Navigation Company

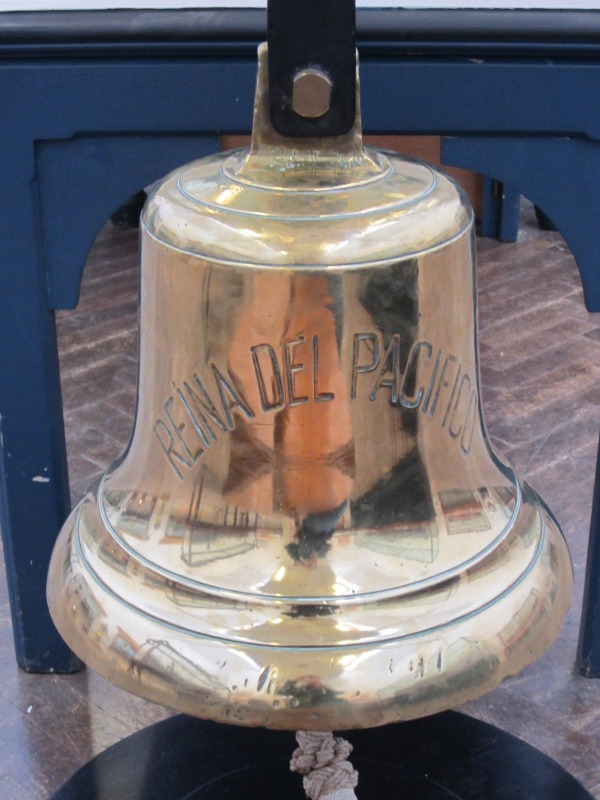
- Reina del Pacifico's bell in the Williamson Art Gallery and Museum

History

United Kingdom
- Name: Reina del Pacifico
- Namesake: Spanish for "Queen of the Pacific"
- Owner: Pacific Steam Navigation Co
- Port of registry: (United Kingdom) Liverpool
- Route: Liverpool – Bermuda – Caribbean – Panama Canal – Valparaíso
- Builder: Harland and Wolff, Belfast
- Yard number: 852
- Launched: 23 September 1930
- Completed: 24 March 1931
- Maiden voyage: 9 April 1931
- Out of service: 27 April 1958
- Identification: Official number 162339; Code letters LGVR (until 1933); call sign GMPS (1934 onward)
- Fate: Scrapped 1958

General characteristics
- Tonnage: 17,707 GRT
- Length: 551.3 ft (168.0 m) p/p; 580 ft (180 m) o/a
- Beam: 76.3 ft (23.3 m)
- Draught: 31 feet 2 3/4 inches (9.52 m)
- Depth: 37.8 ft (11.5 m)
- Installed power: 5,500 BHP; 2,844 NHP
- Propulsion: 4-stroke diesel engines; 4 screws
- Speed: 19 knots (35 km/h)
- Capacity: 880 passengers (as built)
- Sensors & processing systems: wireless direction finding; gyrocompass

MV Reina del Pacifico was a 17,707 GRT ocean liner of the Pacific Steam Navigation Company. She was built in Northern Ireland in 1930–31 and sailed between Liverpool and the Pacific coast of South America until 1939. She served as a troop ship from 1939 until 1946. She returned to her civilian route in 1948 and was scrapped in 1958.

== Building ==
Harland and Wolff built the ship at Belfast, launching her on 23 September 1930 and completing her on 24 March 1931.

Harland and Wolff had a license to build Burmeister & Wain marine diesel engines. Reina del Pacifico was built with four sets of these engines driving four propellers. They developed a total of 5,500 BHP or 2,844 NHP at 145 rpm, giving her a speed of 19 knots (35 km/h).

The ship was briefly the largest and fastest motor liner of her time. These records soon passed to larger and faster ships being built in Italy and Belgium, but for some years Reina del Pacifico remained the largest ship operating scheduled services to the Pacific coast of South America.

The ship had berths for 880 passengers, divided into three classes. The designer of her interior décor travelled to see El Escorial palace in Madrid to get ideas. Her public saloons were decorated in Moresque and Spanish Colonial styles. On her promenade deck was a Grand Hall two decks high.

Reina del Pacifico had no sisters, but her appearance was typical of Harland and Wolff passenger motor ships of her time. She had two broad, low funnels and a cruiser stern. Pacific Steam ships traditionally had black hulls, but the company had Harland and Wolff paint Reina del Pacifico's hull white.

Reina del Pacifico's UK official number was 162339. Her code letters were LGVR until they were superseded in 1934 by the call sign GMPS.

== Service ==
The ship's regular route was between Liverpool and Valparaíso in Chile via Bermuda, the Caribbean and the Panama Canal.

In 1933, the architecture faculty of the Universidad de Chile took a student tour aboard this boat, the trip was to the city in northern Chile, Antofagasta. On that trip, an idea arose among the university students to create a hymn that represented them and that is when Julio Cordero Vallejos began to create a melody on the piano and sang a phrase that would become a legend to this day: "Ser un romántico viajero". It would be just the beginning of what is now the official anthem of the Club Universidad de Chile, an anthem which is sung in the stadiums every time the club plays its soccer matches.

In November 1937 a former UK Prime Minister, Ramsay MacDonald, died aboard her at the age of 71 while on holiday. In 1939, a British expedition to the Central Andes in Peru shipped to South America with the MV Reina del Pacifico.

In the Second World War she was requisitioned to be a troop ship. Many of her passenger fittings were removed and stored in Bootle.

In December 1939 she took 1,455 troops of the First Canadian Division from Halifax, Nova Scotia to the Firth of Clyde. The ship took part in the landings in North Africa, Sicily and Normandy. On 28 January 1945 the ship sailed from Liverpool to Ceylon with Royal Navy personnel destined for the Far East theatre of war. She reached Colombo on 21 February.

In either September 1946 or January 1947 the Ministry of Transport returned the ship to her owners, who had Harland and Wolff refit her in Belfast for civilian service. Her original passenger fittings, stored in Bootle, had been destroyed in an air raid. Refitting her with new fittings took a year.

On sea trials on 11 September 1947 she suffered a serious crankcase explosion in her engine room off the Copeland Islands in the North Channel. The explosion caused the death of 28 members of her crew, Harland and Wolff staff and Pacific Steam's technical staff. Repairing the damage and rectifying the problem took a further year. She finally resumed her Liverpool – Valparaíso route in October 1948.

On 8 July 1957 the ship ran aground 5½ miles (9 km) north of Ireland Island, Bermuda. She was refloated three days later, on 11 July.

A new Pacific Steam liner for the route, Reina del Mar, was launched in 1955 and completed in 1956. On 27 April 1958 Reina del Pacifico reached Liverpool at the end of her final passenger voyage before being withdrawn from service. She was scrapped by John Cashmore Ltd at Newport, Wales, starting on 11 May.

Reina del Pacifico's bell is preserved in the Williamson Art Gallery and Museum, Birkenhead. The ornate wood panelling from her Cigar Lounge forms part of the interior of The Cornmarket public house in Liverpool.

== Bibliography ==
- Harnack, Edwin P (1938) [1903]. All About Ships & Shipping (7th ed.). London: Faber and Faber. p. 557.
- Harnack, Edwin P (1964) [1903]. All About Ships & Shipping (11th ed.). London: Faber and Faber. p. 585.
- McCluskie, Tom (2013). The Rise and Fall of Harland and Wolff. Stroud: The History Press. p. 140. ISBN 978-0752488615.
- Talbot-Booth, EC (1936). Ships and the Sea (Third ed.). London: Sampson Low, Marston & Co. Ltd. pp. 332, 333, 337, 385, 519.
- Talbot-Booth, EC (1942) [1936]. Ships and the Sea (Seventh ed.). London: Sampson Low, Marston & Co. Ltd. pp. 349, 350, 401, 532.
- Wilson, RM (1956). The Big Ships. London: Cassell & Co. pp. 99–100, 104, 110–111.

== Links ==
- "Reina del Pacifico". www.liverpoolships.org.
- “The Liner MV Reina Del Pacifico During Sea Trials” - poem by Irish poet Daniel Wade detailing the 1947 crankcase explosion aboard the ship www.coastmonkey.ie.
