= List of ships of the Canadian Pacific Steamship Company =

The following is a list of ships that were operated by the Canadian Pacific Steamship Company or its predecessor companies, Canadian Pacific Railway and Canadian Pacific Steamships Ocean Services Ltd.

Canadian Pacific Steamship Fleet
Active service	Name	Launch year	Maiden voyage	Other names	Notes	Loss year
Canadian Pacific Railway (1884–1915)
1887	SS Abyssinia	1870	1870	.	Australia route	1891
1887	SS Parthia	1870	1870	.	Australia route	1956
1887	SS Batavia	1870	1870	.	Australia route	1924
1891	RMS Empress of China	1890	1891	.	Pacific, 1891–1911	1912
1891	RMS Empress of India	1890	1891	SS Loyalty (1914–1919)	Pacific, 1891–1914; war service, 1914–1919 (British Raj/Gwalior)	1919
1891	RMS Empress of Japan	1890	1891	.	Pacific, 1891–1914; war service, 1914–1919; Pacific, 1919–1922	1926
1906	RMS Empress of Britain	1905	1906	SS Montroyal, 1924–1930	Atlantic, 1906–1914; war service, 1914–1919; Atlantic, 1919–1930	1930
1906	RMS Empress of Ireland	1906	1906	.	Atlantic, 1906–1914	1914
1913	RMS Empress of Asia	1912	1913	.	Pacific, 1913–1914; war service, 1914–1919; Pacific, 1919–1941; war service, 1941–1942	1942
1913	RMS Empress of Russia	1912	1913	.	Pacific, 1913–1914; war service, 1914–1919; Pacific, 1919–1939; war service, 1940–1945	1945
1914	RMS Empress of France	1912	1914	SS Alsatian (1914–1918)	Atlantic (1912–1914); war service (1914–1917); Atlantic (1918–1934)	1934
Canadian Pacific Steamships Ocean Services Ltd. (1915–1971)
1917	SS Scotian	1898		Originally the SS Statendam of Holland America Line; Then the Allan Line's SS Scotian from 1911 to 1917. Renamed SS Marglen (1922-1927)		1927
1921	RMS Empress of India	1907	1908	Originally German liner SS Prinz Friedrich Wilhelm (1907–1919, 1919–1921); USS Prinz Friedrich Wilhelm (1919); briefly named SS Empress of China; SS Montlaurier (1923–1925); SS Montieth (1925); SS Montnairn (1925–1929)	Atlantic, 1908–1914; in neutral Norway for duration of war then used as troopship by US. Atlantic, 1920–1929	scrapped 1929
1922	RMS Empress of Australia	1913	1919	SS Tirpitz (1919–1921); SS Empress of China (1921)	Atlantic, 1919–1939; war service, 1939–1951	1952
1922	RMS Empress of Scotland	1905	1906	SS Kaiserin Auguste Victoria (1906–1919, 1919–1921); USS Kaiserin August Victoria (1919)	Atlantic, 1906–1914; inactive, 1914–1919; Atlantic, 1920–1930	1930
1922	RMS Empress of Canada	1920	1922	.	Pacific, 1922–1939; wartime service, 1939–1943	1943
1928	RMS Duchess of Atholl	1927	1928	.	Atlantic, 1928–1939; war service, 1939–1942	1942
1928	SS Duchess of Bedford	1928	1928	RMS Empress of France (1947–1960)	Atlantic	1960
1929	SS Duchess of Richmond	1928	1928	RMS Empress of Canada (1947–1953)	Atlantic, 1929–1939; war service, 1939–1947; Atlantic, 1947–1953	1953
1929	SS Duchess of York	1928.	1929.	Keel laid down as Duchess of Cornwall	Atlantic, 1929–1939; war service, 1939–1943	1943
1930	RMS Empress of Japan	1929	1930	RMS Empress of Scotland (1942–1958); SS Hanseatic (1958–1966)	Pacific, 1930–1942; war service, 1942–1947; Atlantic, 1948–1958	1966
1931	RMS Empress of Britain	1930	1931	.	Atlantic, 1931–1939; war service, 1939–1940	1940
1942	RMS Empress of Scotland	1929	1930	RMS Empress of Japan (1930–1942); SS Hanseatic (1958–1966)	Pacific, 1930–1942; war service, 1942–1947; Atlantic, 1948–1958	1966
1947	RMS Empress of Canada	1928	1929	SS Duchess of Richmond (1929–1947)	Atlantic, 1929–1939; war service, 1939–1947; Atlantic, 1947–1953	1953
1948	RMS Empress of France	1928	1928	SS Duchess of Bedford (1928–1947)	Atlantic, 1928–1839; war service, 1939–1947; Atlantic, 1948–1960	1960
1953	RMS Empress of Australia	1924	1924	SS de Grasse (1924–1953); Venezuela (1956–1962)		1962
1956	RMS Empress of Britain	1955	1956	SS Queen Anna Maria (1964–1975); SS Carnivale (1975–1993); SS Fiesta Marina (1993–1994); SS Olympic (1994–1997); SS Topaz (1998–2008)	Atlantic, 1956–1976; Caribbean, 1976–1994	2008
1957	RMS Empress of England	1956	1957	SS Ocean Monarch (1970–1975)	Atlantic, 1957–1970	1975
1961	RMS Empress of Canada	1960	1961	SS Mardi Gras (1972–1993); SS Olympic, SS Star of Texas, SS Lucky Star, SS Apollo, and SS Apollon	Atlantic, 1961–1972; Caribbean (1972–2003)	2003

In 1971, the company changed its name to CP Ships Ltd. Container ships were added to the fleet in response to changing times.

CP SHIPS FLEET
Active Service	Vessel Name	Launch Date	Maiden Voyage	Other Names	Notes	Loss Date
1970	CP Voyageur	1970	1970	Andes Voyageur, Louisiane, Cedar Voyageur, Biokovo, Montreal Venturer, Canmar Valiant, MSC Rebecca	Atlantic	1997
1971	CP Explorer	1961	1962	Beaverpine, Moira, Trade Container	Atlantic.	1986
1971	CP Trader	1971	1971	Andes Trader, San Lorenzo, Canmar Spirit	Atlantic	2001
1971	CP Discoverer	1971	1971	Andes Discoverer, Mississippi, Canmar Venture	Atlantic	2001

== See also ==
- Canadian Pacific Railway Upper Lake Service, which operated the steamers Algoma, Alberta, Athabasca, Manitoba, Assiniboia and Keewatin
