= Jack Rieger =

American film producer

- Born: Jacob Rieger; May 3, 1897; Gorlice
- Died: March 1, 1971 age 73; New York City
- Occupations: producer, director
- Years active: 1936–1955
- Spouse(s): Beatrice Rieger (1924–1933, her death); Sadye Luxenberg

Jack Rieger (born May 3, 1897 Gorlice; died March 1, 1971, New York City) was a low budget producer and inventor.

== Early years ==
Jack Rieger immigrated to the US, and arrived at Ellis Island August 4, 1903, aboard the SS Statendam. He was the son of Leib Rieger, a tailor, and Chane Rieger. Jack Rieger worked in a New York motion picture film laboratory. On August 5, 1936, Rieger filed a voluntary petition in bankruptcy in federal court listing liabilities of $136,795 with no assets.

== Motion Pictures ==
Rieger produced the 1934 film The Yiddish King Lear and became known as an active film maker for hire for heavyweight fights. Rieger offered a six figure sum for the rights to film the 1945 Joe Louis - Billy Conn fight, a record at the time. In 1947 Rieger acquired some footage from an uncompleted and untitled 1940 film starring Cornel Wilde and placed Wilde's scenes with several musical numbers as a 1947 film called Stairway for a Star.

He was associate producer of Captain Scarface, producer of the documentary Savage Africa where he reused the African footage in a feature film called African Manhunt and the 3D film Stereo Laffs (originally shot in 1941 but re-issued in 1953 as A Day in the Country).

== Inventor ==
Jack Rieger held one US patent for a portable collapsible crib and play pen.
