= Jean Bassan =

Jean Bassan was a French writer and dramatists, winner of the prix des libraires in 1958.

== Work ==
Novel

- 1935: Le Centre du monde, éditions Gallimard
- 1958: Le Mauvais Cheval, Plon
- 1958: Nul ne s'évade — Prix des libraires
- 1959: Les Distractions — adapted to cinema in 1960 Trapped by Fear by Jacques Dupont
- 1969: Les Nouveaux Patrons
- 1972: La Possession, éditions Fayard

Theatre

- 1938: Juliette, three-act comedy, La Petite Illustration, n°900. Théâtre, n°450. 24 December
