= Crèvecoeur (film) =

1955 French Korean War documentary

- Directed by: Jacques Dupont
- Written by: Jacques Dupont
- Produced by: René Risacher
- Cinematography: Henri Decaë
- Edited by: Jacques Dupont; Pierre Gillette
- Release date: 4 May 1955
- Running time: 90 minutes
- Country: France
- Language: French

Crèvecoeur (also known as Heartbreak Ridge) is a 1955 French documentary film directed by Jacques Dupont. It was nominated for an Academy Award for Best Documentary Feature. The plot revolves around French troops fighting under the United Nations Command in the Korean War.
