= Savage Africa =

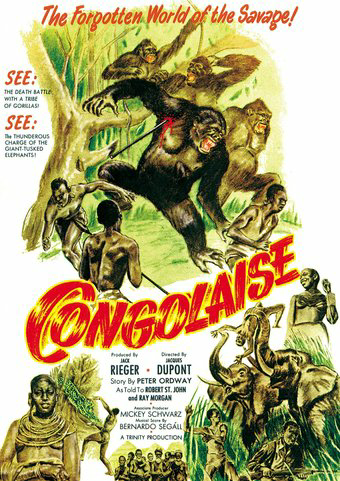
- Directed by: Jacques Dupont
- Written by: Peter Ordway (writer)
- Produced by: Jack Rieger (producer); Mickey Schwarz (associate producer)
- Starring: See below
- Cinematography: Edmond Séchan
- Music by: Bernardo Segall
- Release date: 17 April 1950
- Running time: 68 minutes (US); 78 minutes (France)
- Country: France
- Languages: French; English

Savage Africa is a 1950 French film directed by Jacques Dupont.

The film is also known as Congolaise (American new title).

== Cast ==
- Robert St. John as Narrator
- Ray Morgan as Narrator
