= Canadian Pacific Steamship Company =

Canadian shipping company

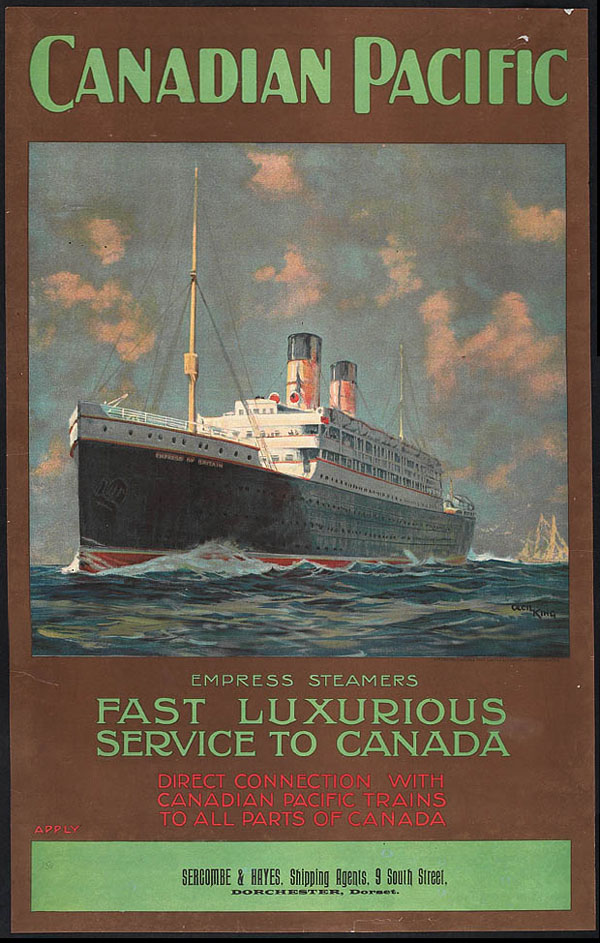
- Poster of the Canadian Pacific Line advertising its Empress steamers
- Industry: Shipping and transportation
- Founded: 1887 in Vancouver, British Columbia, Canada
- Founder: William Cornelius Van Horne
- Defunct: 2005
- Fate: Merged with TUI AG
- Headquarters: City Place Gatwick, London, United Kingdom
- Area served: Transatlantic and transpacific lines
- Footnotes House flag

Canadian Pacific Steamship Company was a large Canadian shipping company established in the 19th century. From the late 1880s until after World War II, the company was Canada's largest operator of Atlantic and Pacific steamships. Many immigrants travelled on Canadian Pacific ships from Europe to Canada.

In 1914 the sinking of the Canadian Pacific steamship RMS Empress of Ireland just before World War I became the largest maritime disaster in Canadian history. The company provided Canadian Merchant Navy vessels in World Wars I and II. Twelve vessels were lost due to enemy action in World War II, including the RMS Empress of Britain, which was the largest ship ever sunk by a German U-boat.

The company moved to a model of container shipping from passenger, freight and mail service in the 1960s due to competitive pressure from the airline industry. The company was a part of the Canadian Pacific Ltd. conglomerate. It was spun out as a separate company in 2001. In 2005, it was purchased by TUI AG and is now part of the company's Hapag-Lloyd division.

The Atlantic and Pacific passenger liners of Canadian Pacific were always British-flagged and largely British-crewed and were not part of the Canadian Merchant Marine, ownership being with the British-registered Canadian Pacific Steamships Ltd. subsidiary.

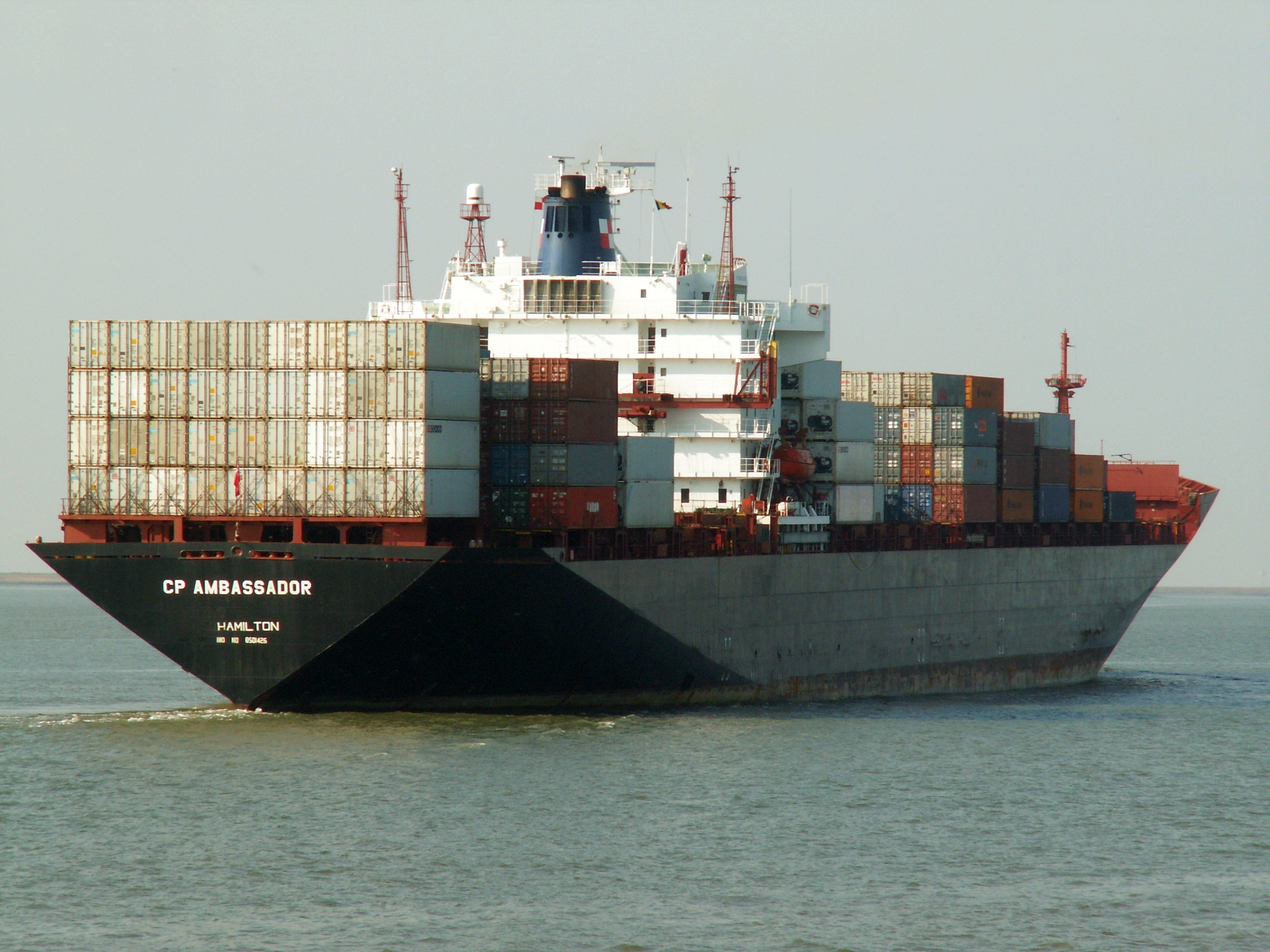
MV CP Ambassador

== History ==
=== Early era (1881–1915) ===
Advertising booklet, c. 1930.

In the early 1880s, the Canadian Pacific Railway (CPR) negotiated with the Government of the United Kingdom to establish trans-Pacific steamship routes between Vancouver, British Columbia and the Far East. The trans-Pacific services of Canadian Pacific were begun by Sir William Cornelius Van Horne, the Canadian-American builder of the railroad network in 1887. In that year, Sir William chartered three vessels from Cunard Line; SS Abyssinia, SS Parthia, and SS Batavia—as a beginning of the CP fleet. The agency for chartering and managing the ships was secured by Adamson, Bell and Company for the first three years.

In 1891, CPR adopted a new name – the Canadian Pacific Steamship Company (CPSC). The CPSC became one of the many shipping companies operating in and out of Liverpool. The company expanded as people emigrating from Europe to North America provided a larger number of passengers and the company also started holiday cruises. As with other shipping companies, CPSC had larger ships built to cope with the demand.

In the late 19th century, CPR initiated an ocean-going service between the port of Vancouver and Hong Kong, with calls at Japan and China, and later at Manila, Philippine Islands and Honolulu, Hawaii. This service provided a link for CPR's transcontinental railroad passenger and freight services. Passengers could travel from England to Eastern Canada, travel across the railway to Vancouver, and on to Asian destinations. During 1887, temporary steamship service was initiated on a Vancouver-Yokohama-Hong Kong route. From 1887 through 1941, the Canadian Pacific Railway provided steamship service between Vancouver and Victoria, British Columbia, Canada and Hong Kong with calls at Japan and China, and later at Manila, Philippine Islands and Honolulu, Hawaii. Three ships were built at Barrow-in-Furness in England, and the three sailed together towards Vancouver in 1890, with initial voyages projected for January 15, February 15, and March 15 of the new year. An 11-foot (3 m) scale model of the ship was put on display in Canadian Pacific's New York offices. In an effort to lure American-Chinese passengers to sail with CPR from North America to Shanghai and Hong Kong, prominent members of the Chinese community in New York were invited to examine the scale model and its amenities.

In 1915, CP changed the name of its shipping business to Canadian Pacific Steamships Ocean Services Ltd.

In 1891, CPR and the British government reached agreement on a contract for subsidised mail service between Britain and Hong Kong via Canada. The route began to be serviced by three specially designed Empress liners—RMS Empress of China, RMS Empress of India and RMS Empress of Japan. Each of these "Empress" steamships sailed regularly in the period from 1891 through 1912. In that year, Empress of China struck a reef near Tokyo, and she was subsequently towed to Yokohama where she was scrapped. Empress of India would continue in service through 1914. RMS Empress of Japan sailed regularly from 1891 through 1922. These three ships and the others which comprised the "Empress fleet" carried mail, passengers, and freight speedily across the Pacific for over half a century.

In 1903, the company took over the ships and services of the Beaver Line and began operating ships on the Atlantic between Halifax, Nova Scotia and the United Kingdom. In 1906, two vessels were built in Scotland: RMS Empress of Britain and RMS Empress of Ireland. These two vessels had a full capacity of 1,530 passengers. There were accommodations for 310 first class, 470 second class passengers, 500 third class and 250 steerage passengers. The CP transported many immigrants from Europe to Canada, primarily from Great Britain and Scandinavia.

CP acquired the successful Allan Line, and expanded to become a major international cargo carrier and operators of luxury passenger liners such as Empress of Britain and Empress of Canada.

==== Sinking of Empress of Ireland ====
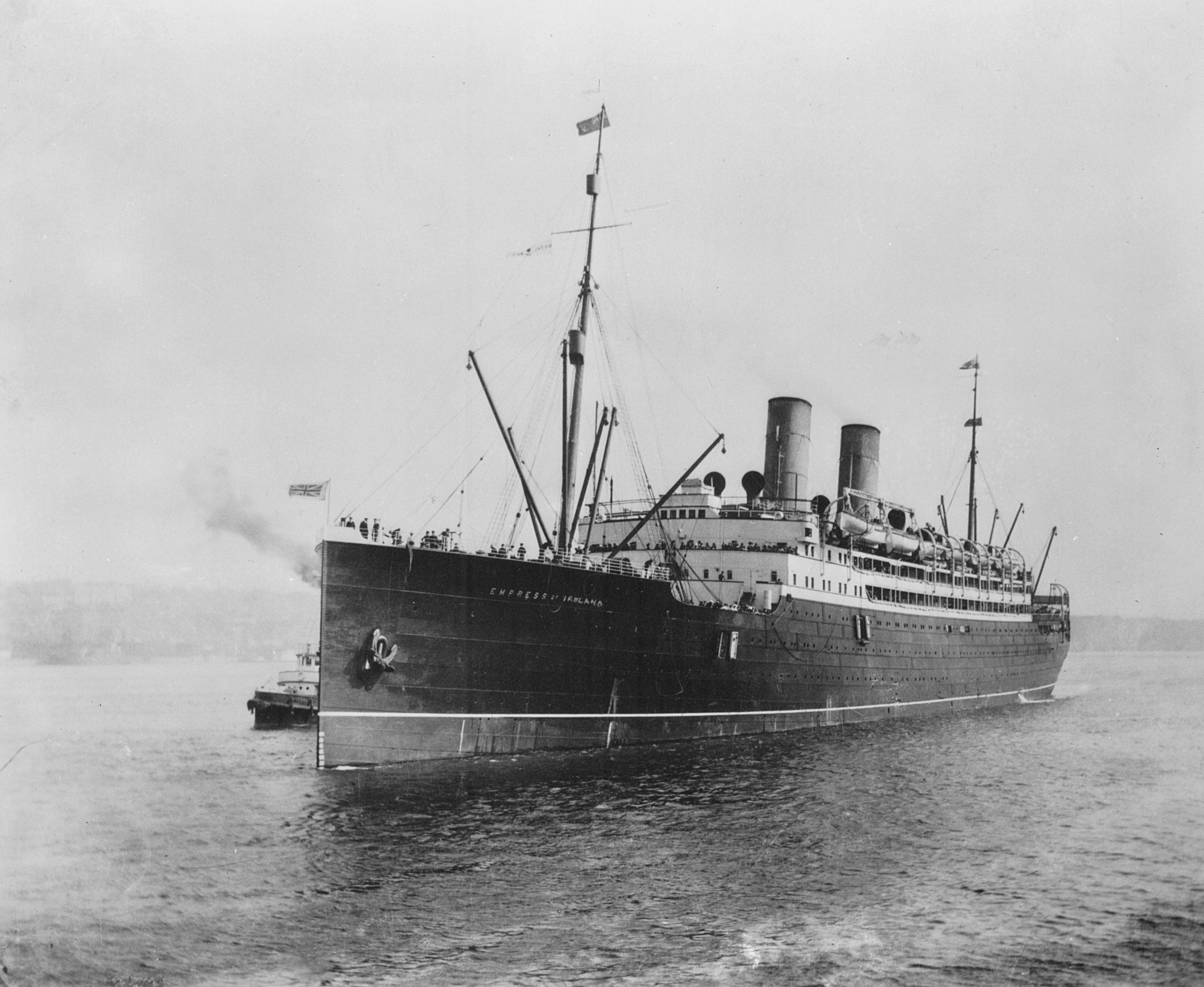
RMS Empress of Ireland

In 1914, Empress of Ireland collided with the Norwegian collier SS Storstad in the Saint Lawrence River. Empress of Ireland sank in 14 minutes and 1,012 perished. Her death toll makes it the deadliest maritime disaster in Canadian history.

Empress of Ireland was heading down the channel near Pointe-au-Père, Quebec in heavy fog. At 02:00 Storstad crashed into the side of the CP liner. Storstad, though damaged, did not sink. Empress of Ireland took severe damage to her starboard side and began to list and take on water. Some passengers managed to get into lifeboats quickly. The ship began to list too far, and additional life rafts were not able to be launched. The ship rolled to her side ten minutes after the collision. Four minutes later the ship had sunk. Only 465 survivors were rescued. A board of inquiry found Storstad responsible for the sinking.

=== World War I (1914–1918) ===
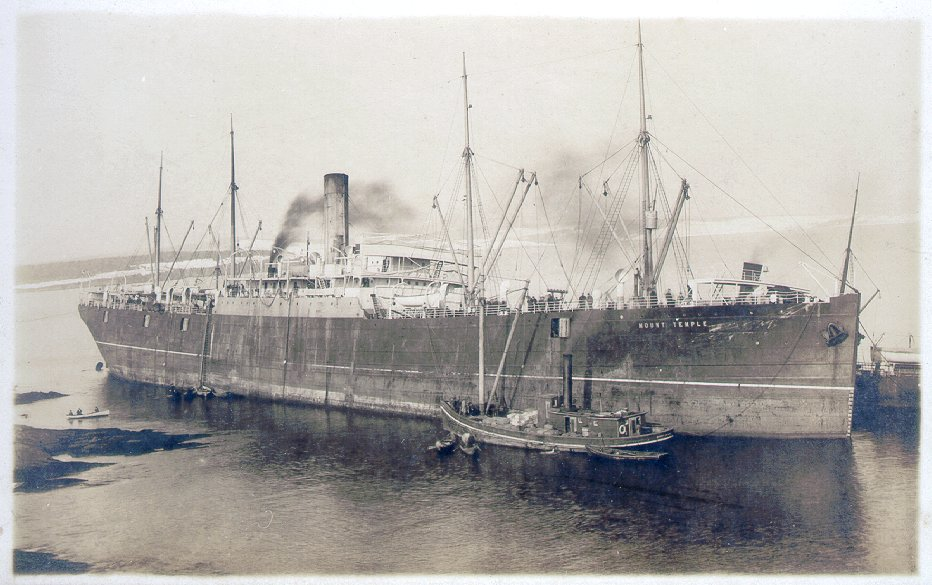
SS Mount Temple aground in Canada before the war.

Canadian Pacific was an important contributor to the British Merchant Navy in World War I. Like other shipping companies, Canadian Pacific provided ships to carry troops in both World Wars. CP lost 18 ships in the war.

In World War I, some ships were refitted as armed merchantmen or auxiliary minelayers. These were operated by the British Royal Navy, not CP Ships. For example, RMS Princess Irene and RMS Princess Margaret were requisitioned at the point of completion by the British Royal Navy for war service. They were crewed by naval personnel, not CP. Neither ship was delivered to CP – Princess Irene exploded in 1915 and Princess Margaret was purchased by the Admiralty after the war.

=== Inter-war period (1919–1938) ===
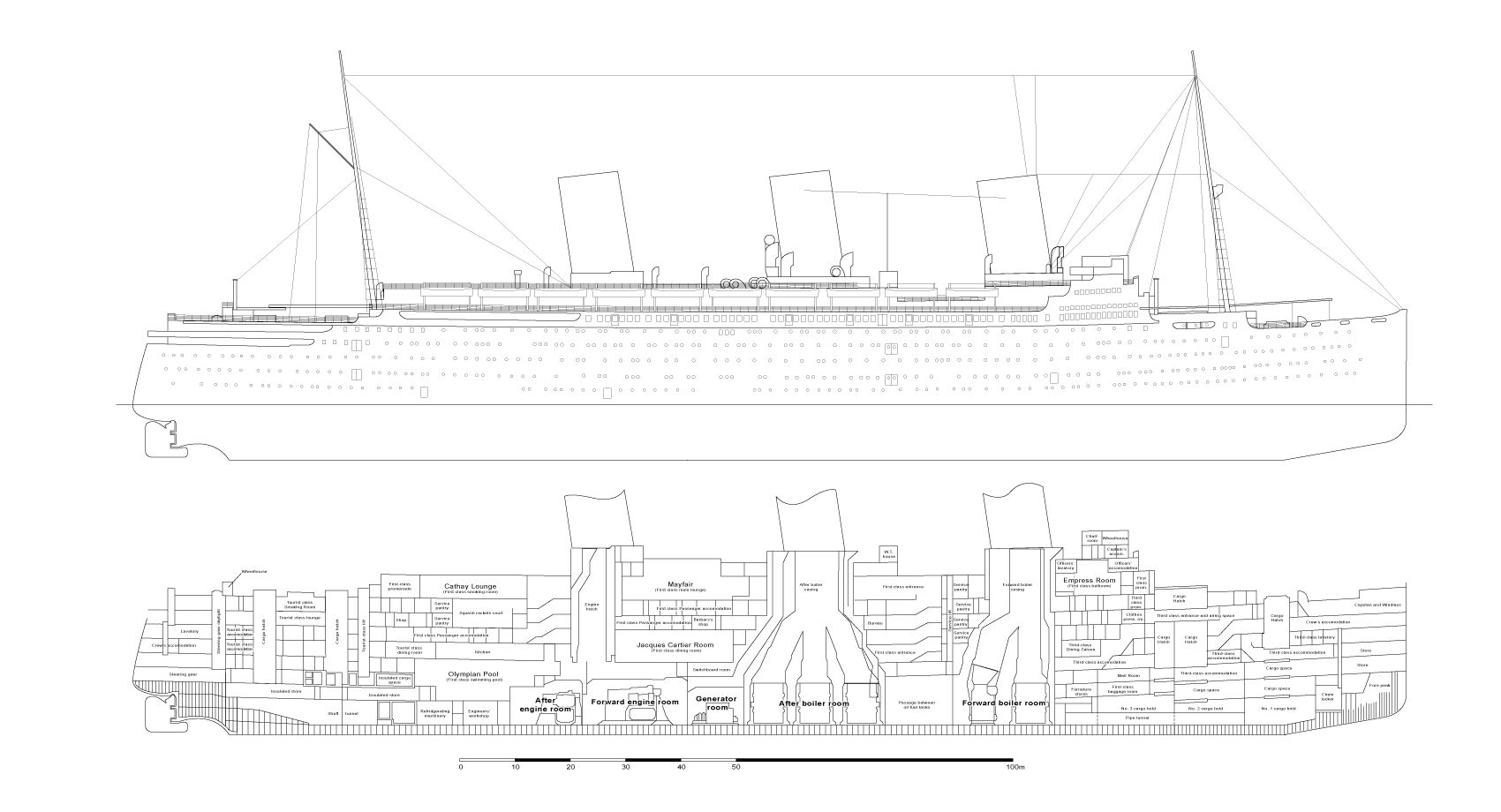
Side elevation plans of Empress of Britain

CP purchased eleven new steamships to replace its losses during the war. New liners including RMS Empress of Australia, RMS Empress of Britain, RMS Duchess of Atholl, SS Duchess of Bedford, SS Duchess of Richmond and SS Duchess of York served on the Atlantic Ocean, while RMS Empress of Canada and RMS Empress of Japan were among the largest liners on the Pacific Ocean during the inter-war period. The company also built a fleet of "Beaver Ships" cargo liners for fast freight service in the 1920s, which were some of the most advanced steam freighters of their time: Beaverford, Beaverdale, Beaverburn, Beaverhill and Beaverbrae.

For the 1939 royal tour of Canada, the Empress of Australia transported King George VI and Queen Elizabeth, from Portsmouth to Quebec City. This was the first-ever visit by the monarch to a dominion. The king chose to visit Canada using a Canadian liner rather than an established British royal yacht. Empress of Australia was considered to be a royal yacht after her use by the king.

=== World War II (1939–1945) ===
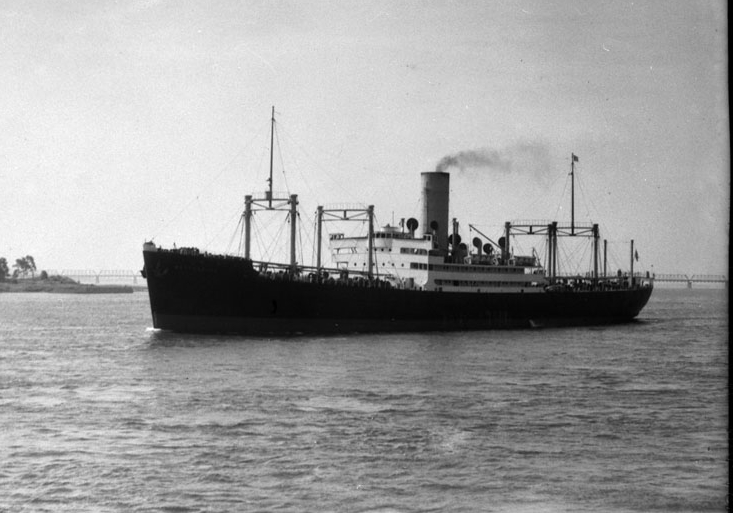
Beaverford at Montreal in 1933

In World War II, the CP fleet carried over a million tons of cargo and a million troops and civilians during World War II. One CP ship, the freighter SS Beaverford, made the most notable military action in the company's history in 1940 as part of Convoy HX 84 when she engaged the German Deutschland-class cruiser Admiral Scheer for five hours before sinking with all hands, a sacrifice that allowed most of convoy HX 84 to escape. The company lost twelve vessels due to enemy action which is a larger loss than any Western company. Empress of Britain was the largest ship lost to enemy action during the Battle of the Atlantic. Losses also included all of its fleet of "Beaver ship" cargo liners. Company ships participated in both the Battle of the Atlantic and the Battle of the Pacific. Despite their extensive and dangerous war service, the CP mariners, part of the Merchant Navy, were denied veterans' benefits by the Canadian Government until 1988.

=== Post-war period (1945–2005) ===
From 1956 to 1961, the company acquired its last three steam passenger ships Empress of Britain, Empress of England and Empress of Canada. Competition from airlines forced CP to retire these ships in the 1970s. The company looked towards bulk carrier and tanker fleets as replacements for its steamships.

In 1971, the company changed its name to CP Ships Ltd. Container ships added as Intermodal freight transport became popular. Intermodal transportation integrated well with CP's rail assets. In 1972, CP Ships regular transatlantic passenger service from the Port of Liverpool finished with the sale of Empress of Canada.

In 1984, CP Ships entered a joint venture with Compagnie Maritime Belge called Canada Maritime to secure North Atlantic container traffic for its rail facilities at the Port of Montreal. This "new" company prospered and the fortunes of CP Ships revived in the early 1990s. In 1993 Canadian Pacific bought out its partner and merged it with CP Ships. The next decade saw the company grow through acquisition. In April 1995 CP Ships purchased the Cast Group out of a bankruptcy proceeding, and subsequently bought Lykes Lines in July 1997 also out of bankruptcy, Contship Containerlines in October 1997 at a profitable level, Australia-New Zealand Direct Line in December 1998 also being profitable, Ivaran Lines in May 1998 (unprofitable), TMM Lines (unprofitable, 50% in January 1999, rest 50% in January 2000), in August 2000 Christensen Canadian African Lines (CCAL) at small profitability and Italia Line in August 2002 at breakeven business results. By 2001 it was the seventh largest carrier in the world, and dominated the North Atlantic. When it was spun off into a separate company it represented 8% of Canadian Pacific's revenues and was a source for a large portion of CPR's rail traffic – much originating from CP Ships' Montreal Gateway Terminals.

=== Sale ===
On August 21, 2005, German conglomerate TUI AG offered to acquire CP Ships Limited for €1.7 billion (US$2.0 billion) in cash, and merge it with TUI's Hapag-Lloyd division. On October 19, 2005, CP Ships and TUI AG jointly announced that 89.1% of CP Ships shareholders had accepted Ship Acquisition Inc.'s August 30 offer for US$21.50 per share on October 25, 2005.

CP Ships archives were held by CP Limited until 2012 when they were donated to the Canadian Museum of Science and Technology.

== Fleet events ==
=== Civilian ===
There are several notable civilian events in the CP fleet.

- In 1912 RMS Empress of China struck a reef near Tokyo and was towed to Yokohama and scrapped. All crew and passengers were uninjured.
- In 1914 RMS Empress of Ireland sank in the St. Lawrence River. 1,012 passengers died in the worst maritime disaster in Canadian history.
- In 1923 RMS Empress of Australia survived the Great Kantō earthquake while in port at Yokohama, Japan. She rescued hundreds of people from the dock, manoeuvred out of port to safety, then provided aid to the population. Capitan Samuel Robinson was appointed a CBE for his actions.

=== World War I ===
CP ships served in the Merchant Navy (United Kingdom) in World War I.

- In 1916 SS Mount Temple was taken by SMS Möwe, a merchant raider of the Imperial German Navy. She was scuttled and her British Empire crew was held prisoner of war. American crewmen were released as the United States was neutral at the time. Four crew were killed.

=== World War II ===
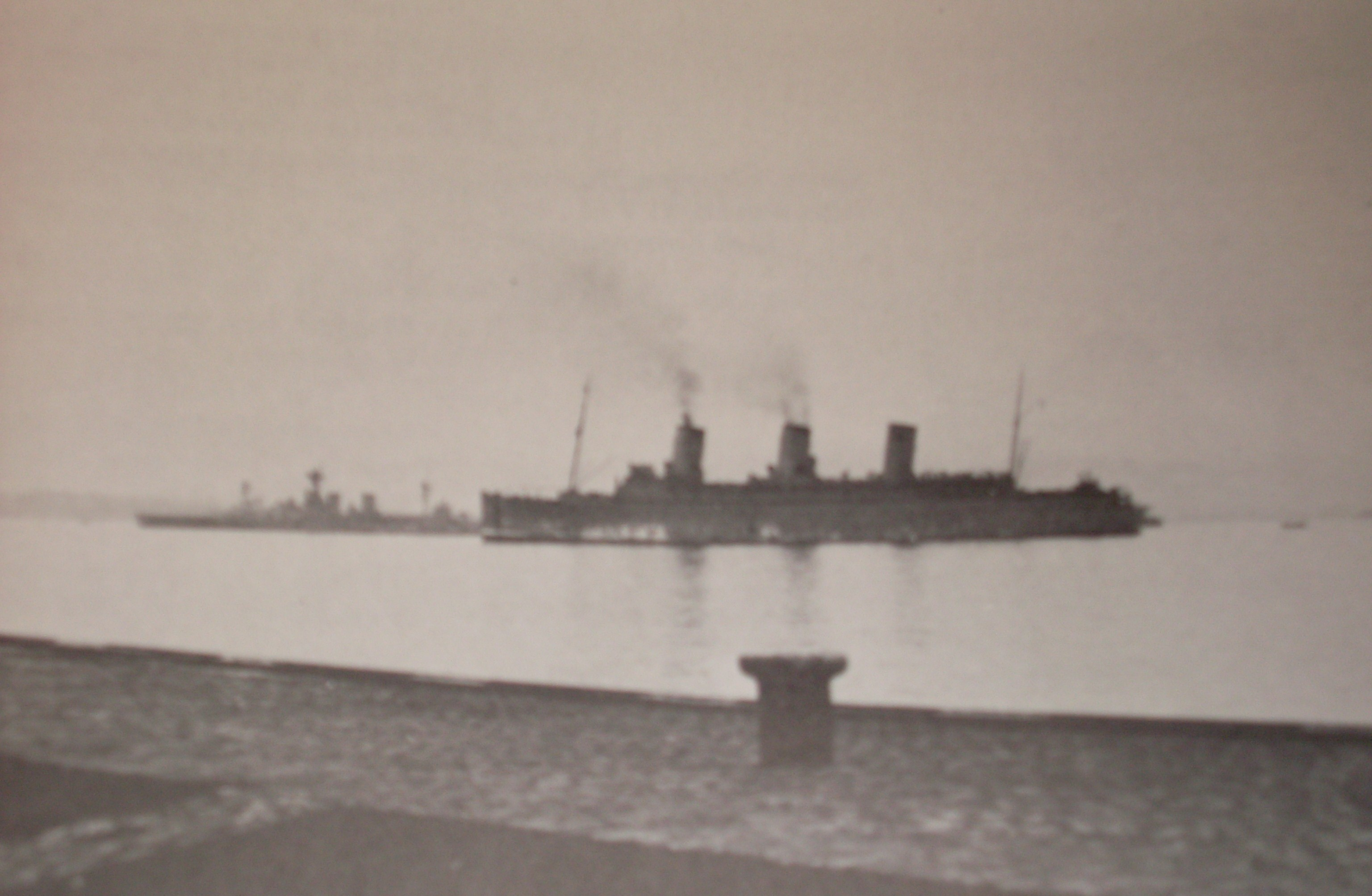
Empress of Britain arriving at Greenock with Canadian troops aboard. (HMS Hood is visible in the background.)

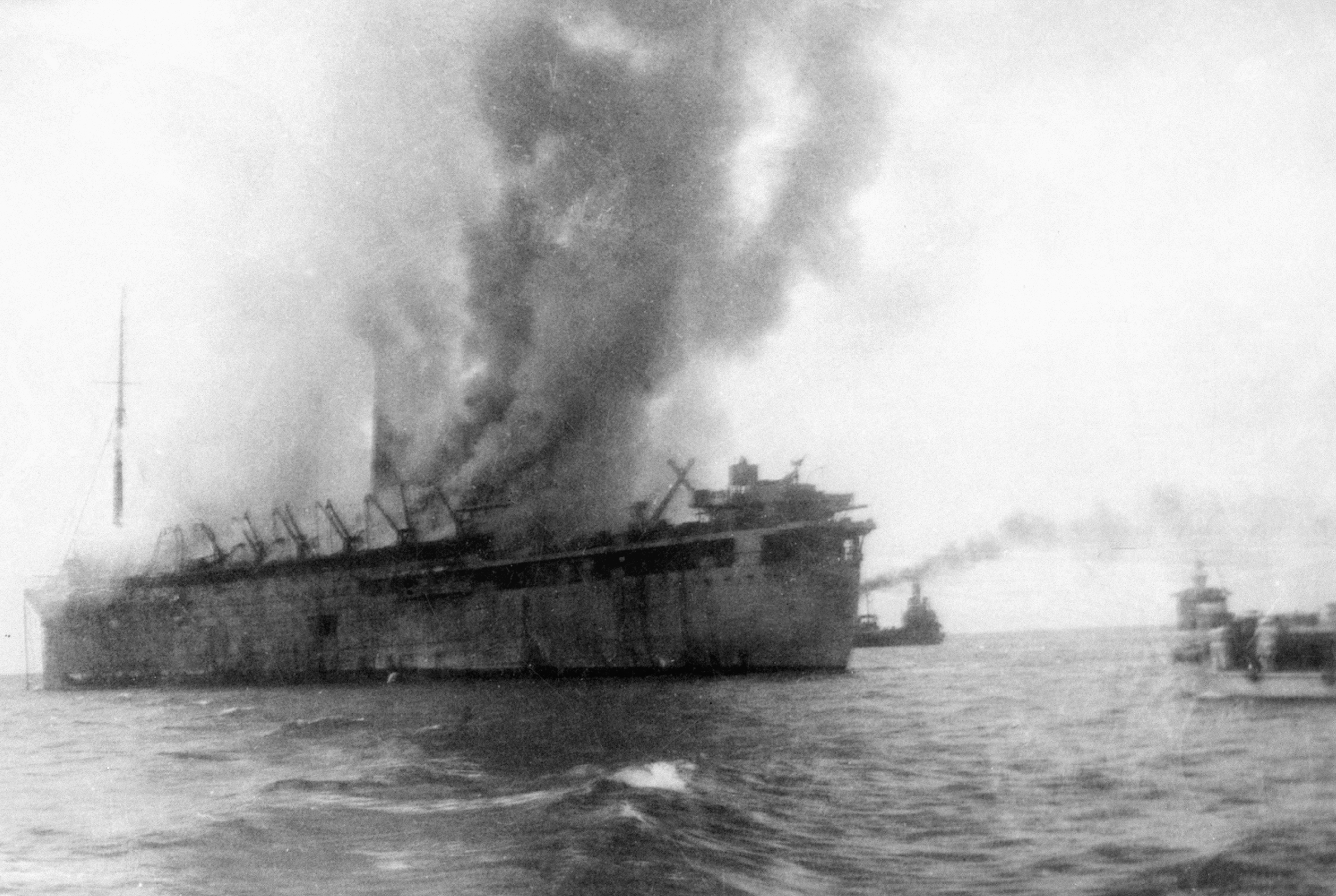
Empress of Asia on fire and sinking after being attacked by Japanese aircraft en route to Singapore.

CP ships served in the Canadian Merchant Navy in World War II. Twelve ships were lost to direct enemy action. Two additional ships were lost to accidents.

- In 1940 RMS Empress of Britain was attacked by a Luftwaffe Focke-Wulf Fw 200 Condor bomber and, while being towed back to port, was torpedoed by U-32, a Kriegsmarine U-boat. She was the largest vessel sunk by a U-boat in WWII. 45 men were lost in the initial attack.
- In 1940 SS Beaverburn was torpedoed by U-boat U-41. One sailor was lost and 76 were rescued by the US tanker Narraganset.
- In the first hours of 19 June 1940 RMS Niagara sailing from Auckland, New Zealand, sank giving a position of 35° 53′ south, 174° 54′ east in the Hauraki Gulf as a result of an explosion whose origin was not known at the time of distress messages. By afternoon mines identified as German had been swept up. It was later determined that the mines had been laid by the German auxiliary cruiser Orion. All crew members were rescued.
- On 5 November 1941 SS Beaverford was part of Convoy HX 84. The convoy was escorted only by the armed merchant cruiser HMS Jervis Bay. The convoy was attacked by the German heavy cruiser Admiral Scheer. Jervis Bay attacked Admiral Scheer to give the convoy the chance to scatter and escape but was quickly sunk. When Admiral Scheer caught up with the convoy, the lightly armed (one 4-inch gun) Beaverford turned to attack the cruiser, engaging it for five hours until Beaverford exploded and sank with all 76 crew. Delayed by Beaverford, thirty-two of the convoy ships were able to escape in the darkness with Admiral Scheer destroying only six ships of the convoy.
- In 1941 SS Beaverbrae was bombed by a Focke-Wulf aircraft and sunk. All crew members were rescued.
- In 1941 SS Beaverdale was torpedoed by U-boat U-48. 21 crew were killed. Captain Draper navigated one lifeboat 300 miles to Iceland. The other lifeboat was rescued at sea.
- In 1942 RMS Empress of Asia was sunk by nine dive-bombers of the Imperial Japanese Navy Air Service near Singapore. 40 crewman survived with Leonard H. Johnson awarded the OBE for his actions.
- In 1942 SS Duchess of Bedford sank a U-boat with its deck gun two days out of Liverpool. It also damaged a second one. Captain Busk-Wood was awarded the OBE for this action.
- In 1942 SS Duchess of Atholl was sunk by the German submarine U-178 2,000 miles off Ascension Island with 831 people on board. Five crewmen were lost in the initial torpedoing, everyone else was rescued from lifeboats by HMS Corinthian.
- In 1943 RMS Empress of Canada was sunk by an Italian submarine off Cape Palmas. 392 of the 1,800 people on board were killed, many were Italian prisoners of war.
- In 1943 SS Duchess of York was sunk by long range Luftwaffe bombers. Twenty-seven crew were killed.

== Notable captains ==
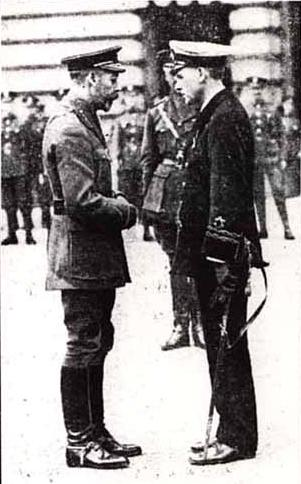
Ronald Stuart receiving his VC from King George V outside Buckingham Palace

- Ronald Niel Stuart VC DSO RD RNR (1886–1954) was highly decorated for his service in the Royal Navy during the first World War. In addition to his British decorations, he was honoured with the French Croix de Guerre and the United States' Navy Cross while serving in the Royal Navy during the First Battle of the Atlantic. The remainder of his naval career was spent with Canadian Pacific. A special warrant was written in 1927 which allowed him to fly the Blue Ensign from any ship, mercantile or military, which he commanded. In 1934, he was named Commodore of the CPS fleet and was placed in command of the 42,000-ton liner RMS Empress of Britain on her transatlantic route. In 1937, he was promoted to company superintendent, a role followed by the job of general manager at Canadian Pacific's London office. He retained this job for 13 years, including through the difficult experiences of World War II when London's dockyards were badly damaged by the London Blitz. During this period, he was made a part-time naval aide-de-camp to King George VI in 1941 – a position he held part-time throughout World War II.
- Captain Sir Samuel Robinson KBE (1870–1958) served 37 years at sea on Canadian Pacific vessels. He earned international acclaim as captain of RMS Empress of Australia which was at Yokohama in Tokyo Bay during the devastating Great Kanto earthquake of 1923. He would be credited with saving the ship, his crew and passengers, and more than 3,000 others during the unfolding catastrophe. Robinson's honours included Commander of the Order of the British Empire (CBE); Knight Commander of the Most Excellent Order of the British Empire (KBE);Order of the Chrysanthemum (Japan); Order of St John of Jerusalem, the Silver Medal (UK); Lloyd's Medal for Meritorious Service (UK); Medal of Honour, Red Ribbon (Japan); Order of the White Elephant (Siam); Cross of the Second Class of the Order of Naval Merit (with white badge) (Spain).
- Captain John Wallace Thomas CBE (1888–1965) served with distinction in both first and second World Wars. He was appointed as a Commander of the Order of the British Empire (CBE) for his handling of RMS Empress of Scotland during an attack by the Luftwaffe off the coast of Ireland on November 9, 1940. Captain Thomas was the only member of the Canadian merchant navy to have been honoured with the CBE during that war.

== Corporate timeline ==
- 1881 Canadian Pacific Railway was founded.
- 1891 Shipping assets are incorporated into Canadian Pacific Steamship Company.
- 1915 Name changed to Canadian Pacific Steamships Ocean Services Ltd.
- 1971 Name changed to CP Ships Ltd.
- 2001 CP Ships Ltd. is spun out from the conglomerate Canadian Pacific Limited and became an independent company.
- 2005 CP Ships Ltd. is acquired by TUI AG

· 2013 Name Canadian Pacific Steamships Ltd (abandoned by TUI AG) is registered by Eyecon Brands Ltd. of Ontario, Canada.

== See also ==
- Canadian Merchant Navy
- List of ships of the Canadian Pacific Steamship Company
- CPR Coastal and Lake services:
  - Canadian Pacific Railway Coast Service
  - Canadian Pacific Railway Upper Lake Service
  - Canadian Pacific Railway Lake and River Service
- List of largest container shipping companies
