= Trapped by Fear =

- Directed by: Jacques Dupont
- Written by: Jean Bassan (adaptation); Roger Ribadeau-Dumas (adaptation); Jacques Dupont (adaptation); Jean Bassan (dialogue)
- Based on: Jean Bassan (novel)
- Produced by: Robert Chabert; Lucien Masson
- Starring: Jean Paul Belmondo; Alexandra Stewart; Sylva Koscina; Claude Brasseur
- Cinematography: Jean-Jacques Rochut; Michel Flour
- Edited by: Pierre Gillette
- Music by: Richard Cornu
- Color process: Black and white
- Production companies: CEI Incom; France Cinéma Productions; La Société des Films Sirius; Société Française de Cinématographie
- Distributed by: Compagnie Française de Distribution Cinématographique
- Release date: 4 November 1960
- Running time: 87 minutes
- Countries: France; Italy
- Language: French

Trapped by Fear (French: Les distractions) is a 1960 French crime film directed by Jacques Dupont and starring Jean Paul Belmondo, Alexandra Stewart, Sylva Koscina and Claude Brasseur.

It had admissions in France of 955,037.

== Plot ==
A speeding motorist causes an accident and kills an officer. Paul, a rather bohemian reporter-photographer, is called to the scene. The man fled, leaving his passport behind. Paul recognizes Laurent, a paratrooper like him during the Algerian war and who saved his life.

== Cast ==
- Jean-Paul Belmondo as Paul Frapier
- Alexandra Stewart as Véra
- Sylva Koscina as Arabelle
- Claude Brasseur as Laurent Porte
- Eva Damien as Dany
- Mireille Darc as Maïa
- Yves Brainville as Le commissaire de police
- Raymond Pélissier as Himself
- Sady Rebbot as Le photographe de mode (as Sadi Rebot)
- Yves Buscail as Himself
- Georges Hubert as Himself
- Renée Duchateau as Himself
- Noémie Bar-Or as Himself
- Arik Bar-Or as Himself
- Corrado Guarducci as L'ami d'Arabelle
- Linda Sini as La concierge
- Jacques Jouanneau as Maxime
