= Captain Scarface =

1953 film by Paul Guilfoyle

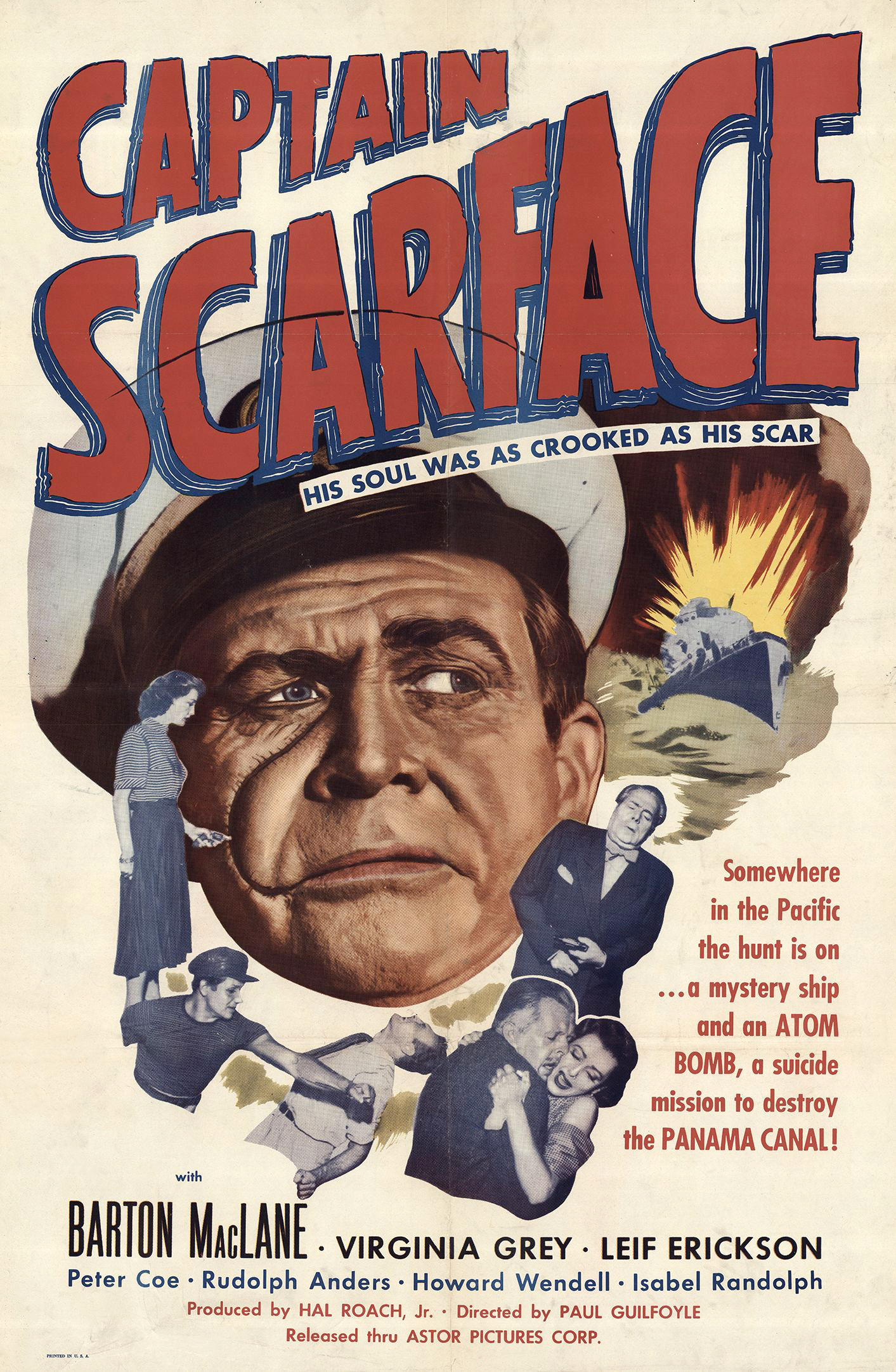
- Directed by: Paul Guilfoyle
- Written by: Charles Lang (original story and screenplay)
- Produced by: Jack Rieger (associate producer); Hal Roach Jr. (producer)
- Cinematography: Norbert Brodine
- Edited by: Gene Fowler Jr.
- Music by: Leon Klatzkin
- Distributed by: Astor Pictures
- Release date: 15 October 1953
- Running time: 72 minutes
- Country: United States
- Language: English

Captain Scarface is a 1953 American thriller film directed by Paul Guilfoyle, and starring Barton MacLane, Virginia Grey, and Leif Erickson.

== Plot ==
In the waters off South America, the Soviets torpedo the tramp steamer and banana boat SS Baños and murder the survivors with the cooperation of the ship's radioman, Clegg who escapes with his life and a promise of $5000. The Soviets have mocked up their own ship as the SS Baños that contains an atomic device with the goal of sailing the Baños to the locks of the Panama Canal where they will detonate their ship on an atomic bomb suicide mission.

To avoid suspicion the new crew of the mocked up Baños takes the contingent of passengers scheduled to sail on the original Baños. One last minute addition is American expatriate Sam Wilton who has overstayed his welcome as a plantation overseer by making love to the plantation owner's wife. As a result, Sam and his lover's husband are both wounded in a gunfight. Sam needs to escape to the United States without his passport that is still at the plantation.

At the Los Rios Hotel in the port city of San Brejo that is also Sam's watering hole, Sam asks his friend Manuel the owner to get him a passport in a false name to escape the vengeance of the plantation owner and the sympathetic local authorities. As Sam waits and drinks, he observes the passengers of the SS Baños in the hotel; an older American couple Fred and Kate Dilts, American Everett Crofton, the mysterious Mr Kroll, and two Germans, Dr Yeager and his daughter Elsa. The new Captain of the Baños, "Captain Scarface" sends Clegg to meet Kroll at the Los Rios Hotel for his just reward. When the passengers are taken to the Baños, Kroll, Clegg and Sam remain behind at the hotel. In the interest of economy and security, Kroll attempts to murder Clegg, but Clegg kills Kroll first. Escaping with the money, Clegg shoots at Manuel and Sam, who responds by shooting Clegg. Never wasting an opportunity, Sam splits the $5000 with Manuel and modifies the late Mr Kroll's passport with own photograph and takes Kroll's boarding pass to the Baños.

Boarding the ship, Sam as Kroll delays meeting Captain Scarface in order to interview Elsa to find out the lay of the land. He pieces together that Dr. Yeager is a German atomic scientist allowed to escape from the Soviet Union in order to work the atomic device in exchange for the safety of his daughter, and Kroll was a Soviet agent assigned to bring in the Yeagers and kill Clegg.

Also on the ship is a venomous fer-de-lance snake concealed in a cargo of bananas that kills Kate Dilts. In grief her husband jumps overboard committing suicide.

Sam Wilton gets control of the ship, radios the authorities and the bad guys are arrested. The mission fails.

== Cast ==
- Barton MacLane as Capt. 'Scarface' Trednor
- Virginia Grey as Elsa Yeager
- Leif Erickson as Sam Wilton
- Peter Coe as Perro, Trednor's Mate
- Rudolph Anders as Dr. Yeager
- Howard Wendell as Fred Dilts, passenger
- Isabel Randolph as Kate Dilts, passenger
- Paul Brinegar as Clegg, saboteur
- Don Dillaway as Everett Crofton, passenger
- Martin Garralaga as Manuel, tavern keeper
- John Mylong as Kroll, Soviet
