= RMS Empress of France (1928) =

Ocean liner built in Scotland

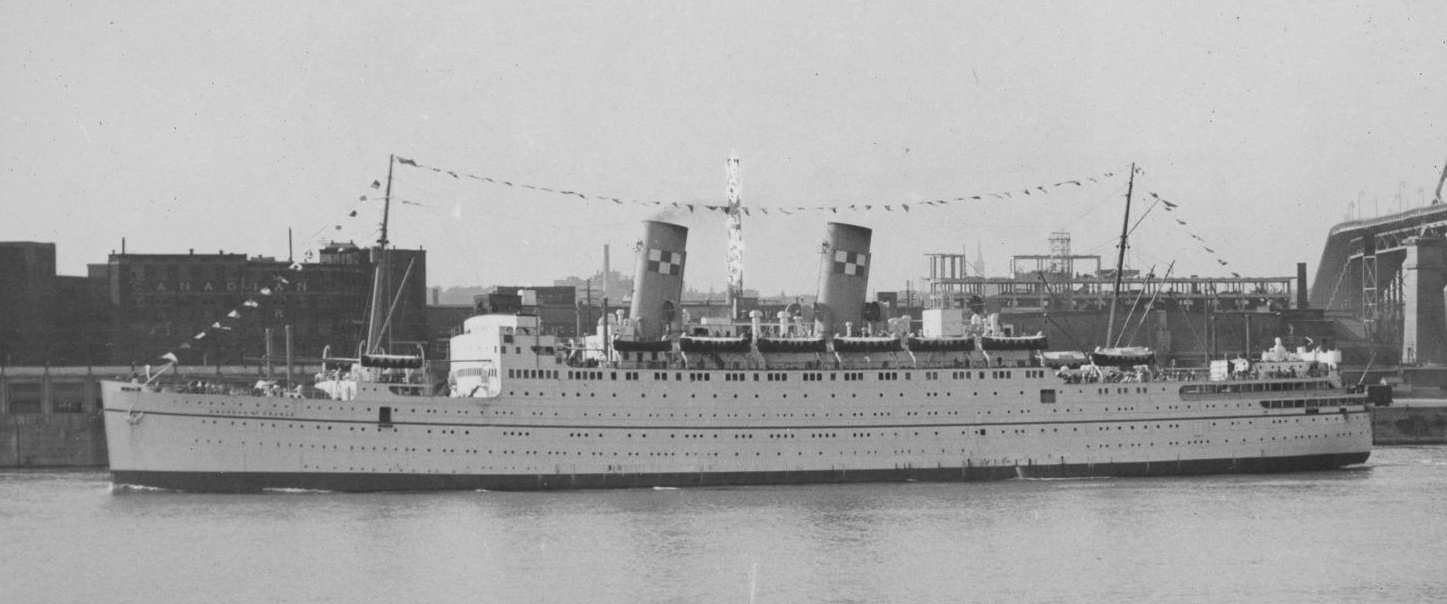
- Empress of France

History

United Kingdom
- Name: 1928–1947: SS Duchess of Bedford; 1947–1960 RMS Empress of France
- Owner: Canadian Pacific Steamships
- Port of registry: London, United Kingdom
- Builder: John Brown, Clydebank
- Yard number: 518
- Launched: 24 January 1928
- Completed: May 1928
- Out of service: 1960
- Fate: Scrapped in December 1960

General characteristics
- Type: Ocean liner
- Tonnage: 20,123 GRT (1947, 20,448 GRT)
- Length: 601 ft (183.2 m)
- Beam: 75 ft (22.9 m)
- Propulsion: Two steam turbines, twin propellers
- Speed: 18 knots
- Capacity: As built 580 cabin, 480, tourist, 510 3rd. 1947, 400 1st class, 300 tourist
- Crew: 510

Photograph of Empress of France

RMS Empress of France was an ocean liner built in 1928 by John Brown at Clydebank, Scotland for the Canadian Pacific Steamships and launched as SS Duchess of Bedford in 1928. She was renamed Empress of France in 1947.

== Duchess of Bedford ==
Duchess of Bedford was one of four 20,000-gross ton Canadian Pacific liners along with sister ships Duchess of York, Duchess of Richmond, and Duchess of Atholl. The quartet were "Mini-Empresses," built to go further up the St. Lawrence River, past Quebec City, to Montreal, hoping to cater to travellers who would then travel by train to Chicago and the American Midwest – a faster journey than it would take going through New York. All were equipped with hot and cold running water in all cabins. The class were known as the "Drunken Duchesses" for their tendency to roll.

Among Duchess of Bedford's better-known passengers in 1931 was Montagu Norman, the Governor of the Bank of England, who was en route from Canada to England when he received word the United Kingdom had permanently abandoned the gold standard.

The writer Elspeth Huxley worked on her biography of Lord Delamere while crossing the Atlantic in 1933.

=== Troopship ===
At the outbreak of war in September 1939, Duchess of Bedford was commandeered by the Admiralty to bring civil and military officials from England to India.

Duchess of Bedford was amongst the ships which evacuated Singapore in 1941. Duchess of Bedford transported 1,955 men of the 18th Infantry Division to Singapore before it fell, departing Bombay on 19 January 1942 and arriving ten days later. Duchess of Bedford was joined by an "empress" sister ship in this convoy duty. The troopship SS Empress of Japan carried 1,981 men of the 18th Division. The convoy departed with evacuees on 30 January.

Duchess of Bedford may best be known for her role in Operation Torch, where, along with HMS Warwick Castle, she carried troops of the 16th Infantry Regiment, 1st Division, United States from Greenock stopping briefly in Glasgow, Scotland, to Arzew, Algeria where she landed said troops on 8 November 1942 to facilitate the United States' first involvement in the theater and the overall invasion of Axis-held North Africa.

After Allied forces successfully drove remaining German and Italian forces from North Africa, she again served, landing troops at Avola in the Invasion of Sicily, and again, with the invasion of the Italian mainland at Salerno.

In June 1944, she arrived at Lagos and transported the 10th Battalion, Nigeria Regiment to India to join the 82nd (West Africa) Division in the Burma Campaign.

== Empress of France ==
War losses reduced the Canadian Pacific fleet considerably and only the Liverpool-Montreal route was reopened post war. The two surviving Cabin class Duchesses were upgraded to "Empress" status with much reduced passenger numbers (400 1st, 300 tourist, down from the pre-war three class capacity of 1,570). On 3 March 1947, Duchess of Bedford arrived at the Govan yard of the Fairfield Shipbuilding and Engineering Company for her overhaul and refit, during the course of which (in October 1947) she was renamed Empress of France. Preliminary plans to name the ship Empress of India were laid aside when India's independence was declared in August 1947. She re-entered service from Liverpool to Montreal on 1 September 1948.

In a 1958/1959 refit, her funnel tops were streamlined and her accommodation was revised to 218 1st class and 482 tourist. The ship was taken out of service in 1960; and she was broken up at Newport in late December of the same year.

== See also ==
- CP Ships
- List of ocean liners
