= RMS Duchess of Atholl =

Steam turbine ocean liner and troop ship

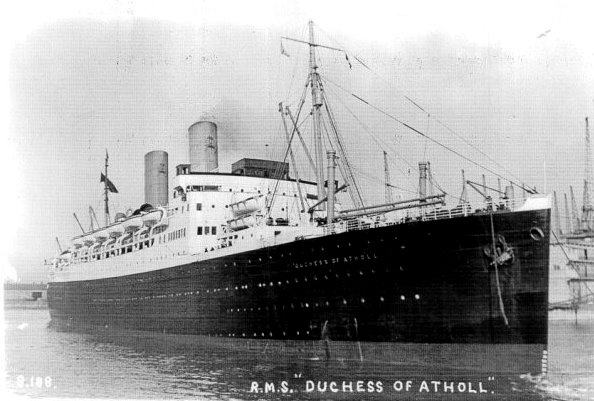

History
- Name: Duchess of Atholl
- Namesake: Katharine, Duchess of Atholl
- Owner: Canadian Pacific Railway Co
- Operator: Canadian Pacific SS Ltd
- Port of registry: (United Kingdom) London
- Builder: William Beardmore & Co, Dalmuir
- Yard number: 648
- Launched: 23 November 1927
- Completed: June 1928
- Maiden voyage: 13 July 1928
- Identification: UK official number 160505; code letters LBWG (until 1933); call sign GNTS (from 1930)
- Fate: Sunk on 10 October 1942

General characteristics
- Type: 1928–39: ocean liner; 1940–42: troop ship
- Tonnage: 20,119 GRT; 11,866 NRT (until 1932); 11,872 NRT (1934–37); 11,772 NRT (from 1939)
- Length: 582.0 ft (177.4 m)
- Beam: 75.2 ft (22.9 m)
- Draught: 27 ft 0 in (8.23 m)
- Depth: 41.7 ft (12.7 m)
- Decks: 4
- Installed power: 3,557 NHP
- Propulsion: six steam turbines, twin screws
- Speed: 17.5 knots (32.4 km/h; 20.1 mph)
- Capacity: as ocean liner: 580 first class; 480 tourist class; 510 third class
- Crew: as troop ship: 265 plus 26 DEMS gunners
- Sensors & processing systems: direction finding equipment; submarine signalling equipment (removed by 1937); echo sounding equipment (added by 1937)
- Armament: as troop ship: 1 × BL 6 inch Mk XII naval gun; 1 × QF 3 inch 20 cwt gun; 4 × anti-aircraft Oerlikon 20 mm cannon; 4 × machine guns
- Notes: sister ships: Duchess of Bedford, Duchess of Richmond, Duchess of York

RMS Duchess of Atholl was one of a class of four steam turbine ocean liners built in Glasgow in 1927–29 for Canadian Pacific Steamships Ltd's transatlantic service between Britain and Canada.

In the Second World War she was converted into a troop ship. In 1942 a U-boat sank her in the South Atlantic, killing four of Duchess of Atholl's crew, whilst 821 survivors were rescued.

== Cabin liners ==
In the First World War, Canadian Pacific pioneered a new class of passenger accommodation which it called "cabin class". It superseded both first and second class and proved popular. After that war the number of third class passengers crossing the North Atlantic declined rapidly, and other lines started to copy CP by converting a larger proportion of their accommodation to cabin class.

In 1926 Canadian Pacific ordered a set of four new 20,000 GRT cabin class liners for its North Atlantic service between Britain and Canada. Their accommodation classes were to be "cabin", "tourist" and "third".

CP chose the names of the new ships to reflect this revision of classes. Since the 1890s CP had given its most prestigious liners names beginning with "Empress of", and had given many of its other passenger ships names beginning with "M". But it named the four new ships after British duchesses, suggesting a status below royalty but above any other rank.

== Building ==
By the 1920s the marine use of steam turbines was well-established, but the four new ships pioneered the use of much higher-pressure steam than previous ships, which gave them more economical fuel consumption. John Brown & Company built three of the ships at Clydebank. Duchess of Atholl was unique in being built by William Beardmore and Company at Dalmuir, but was otherwise similar to her sisters.

Duchess of Atholl was launched in late 1927, before any of her sisters from John Brown & Co. She was launched by Katharine Stewart-Murray, Duchess of Atholl, the Scottish Unionist MP after whom she was named. A silent documentary film made at the time about shipbuilding, Birth of a Liner, includes the launch of Duchess of Atholl and a visit to the John Brown shipyard by Elizabeth Bowes-Lyon, Duchess of York.

During Duchess of Atholl's fitting-out an accident to one of her turbines delayed her completion until June 1928, at least a month after John Brown & Co completed her sister Duchess of Bedford.

Duchess of Atholl was 582.0 ft (177.4 m) long, had a beam of 75.2 ft (22.9 m) and draught of 27 ft 0 in (8.23 m). She was measured at 20,119 gross register tons (GRT) and as built she was 11,866 net register tons (NRT). She had six water-tube boilers with a combined heating surface of 30,696 square feet (2,852 m^{2}). They supplied steam at 370 pounds per square inch (2,600 kPa) to a set of six steam turbines. These developed a combined power output of 3,557 NHP and drove twin screws via single reduction gearing, giving her a speed of 17.5 knots (32.4 km/h; 20.1 mph).

== Civilian service ==
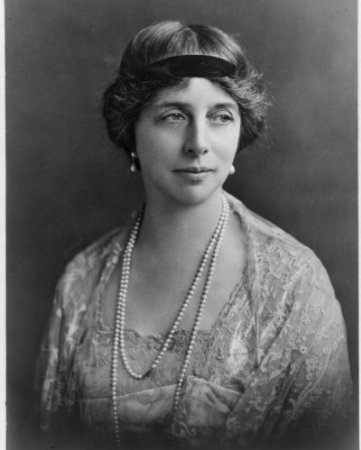
Katharine Stewart-Murray, Duchess of Atholl, after whom the ship was named

On 13 July 1928 Duchess of Atholl left Liverpool on her maiden voyage to Montreal, six weeks after Duchess of Bedford. That same year Duchess of Atholl set a record of six days and 13 hours for an eastbound crossing from Canada to Liverpool, but she held the record for only a month.

John Brown & Co completed Duchess of Richmond in December 1928 and Duchess of York in March 1929. The regular route for all four sisters was between Liverpool and Quebec. The new ships acquired a bad reputation for "lively" motion in heavy seas. As a result, they became nicknamed the "Drunken Duchesses".

On one eastbound crossing in 1935 Duchess of Atholl lost her rudder. She managed to reach Liverpool three days late.

Duchess of Atholl carried wireless direction finding equipment and submarine signalling equipment. Submarine signalling was becoming obsolete as a form of communication, so by 1937 it had been removed and echo sounding equipment had been installed.

Duchess of Atholl's net register tonnage was slightly revised several times in the 1930s. From 1939 it was listed as 11,772 NRT.

When the Second World War broke out in September 1939 Duchess of Atholl at first continued her scheduled liner service between Liverpool, Montreal and Quebec, taking about eight days for each North Atlantic crossing. This ceased when she reached Liverpool on 27 November.

== Troop ship ==
Duchess of Atholl was requisitioned in December 1939 and converted into a troop ship. On 4 January 1940 she sailed from the Clyde to the Mediterranean, calling at Gibraltar, Marseille and Malta and reaching Alexandria in Egypt on 19 January. She sailed between Alexandria, Gibraltar, Malta and Marseille until 5 March 1940, when she left Gibraltar and returned to the Clyde.

On 25 March 1940 Duchess of Atholl resumed transatlantic duties, but now bringing Canadian troops to the UK. Her first voyage was unescorted via St John's, Newfoundland to Halifax, Nova Scotia and back. Her second voyage, in June 1940, was with Convoy TC 5, in which she carried 1,173 troops from Halifax to Liverpool. Thereafter she made five unescorted crossings to Canada and back, usually to Montreal and sometimes including Quebec.

On 17 November 1940 Duchess of Atholl left Liverpool for Egypt with Convoy WS 4B, which went via Freetown in Sierra Leone and Cape Town in South Africa to Suez. The convoy spent Christmas in the Indian Ocean and reached Suez on 28 December 1940. Duchess of Atholl embarked evacuees and left Suez on 12 January 1941 with Convoy SW 4B, which gave her escorted passage as far as Durban in South Africa. From there she continued unescorted via Cape Town and Freetown and reached Liverpool on 22 February.

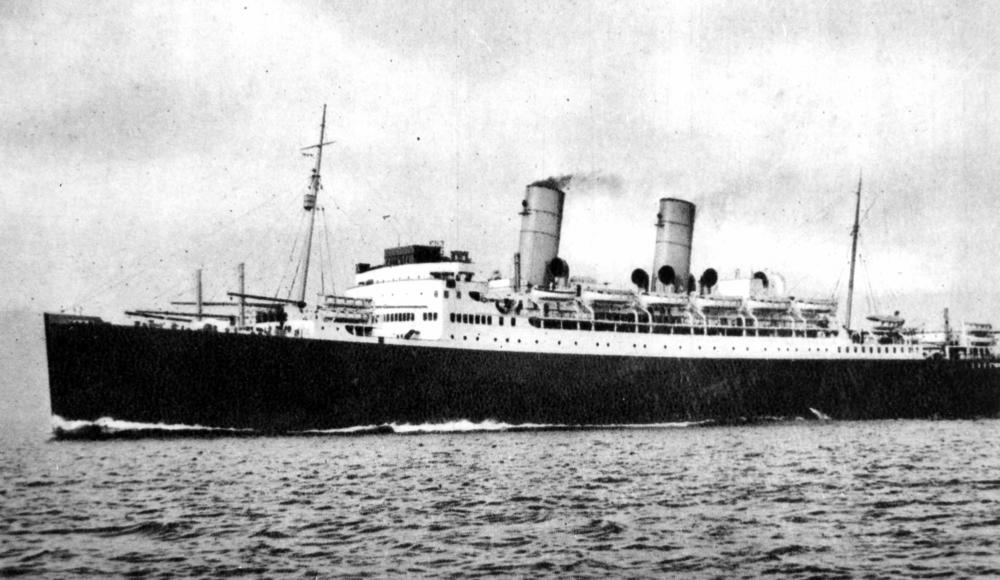
Duchess of York, which sailed with Duchess of Atholl in Convoy WS 7 in 1941 and Convoy WS 21P in 1942

On 21 March 1941 Duchess of Atholl again left Liverpool for Egypt. She sailed via Freetown to Cape Town with Convoy WS 7, which happened to include her sister ship Duchess of York. Duchess of Atholl then continued unescorted, reaching Suez on 6 May 1941. On 25 May 1941 Duchess of Atholl left Suez on her return voyage, and three days later she reached Aden where she joined Convoy SW 7 to Durban. By the time she left Aden Duchess of Atholl's passengers were 629 Merchant Navy personnel. From Durban she continued unescorted via Cape Town, crossed the South Atlantic and reached Trinidad on 14 July. From there she sailed unescorted to the Clyde, where she arrived on 27 July.

Records of Duchess of Atholl's movements between August and October 1941 records are incomplete. On 30 October she sailed from the Clyde carrying 3,128 troops in Convoy CT 5 to Halifax and on 13 November she left Halifax carrying 2,218 troops in Convoy TC 15 to the Clyde.

Duchess of Atholl's next voyage was from Scotland to South Africa. She left the Clyde on 8 December with Convoy WS 14 but developed defects and had to turn back. She reached Durban in January, spent a few days in port and then sailed on 21 January for Trinidad, where she arrived on 5 February. She then sailed via Bermuda to New York, where she arrived on 15 February. On 19 February 1942 Duchess of Atholl left New York with Convoy AT 12. She called at Halifax and brought about 3,000 troops across the Atlantic, reaching Belfast on 2 March.

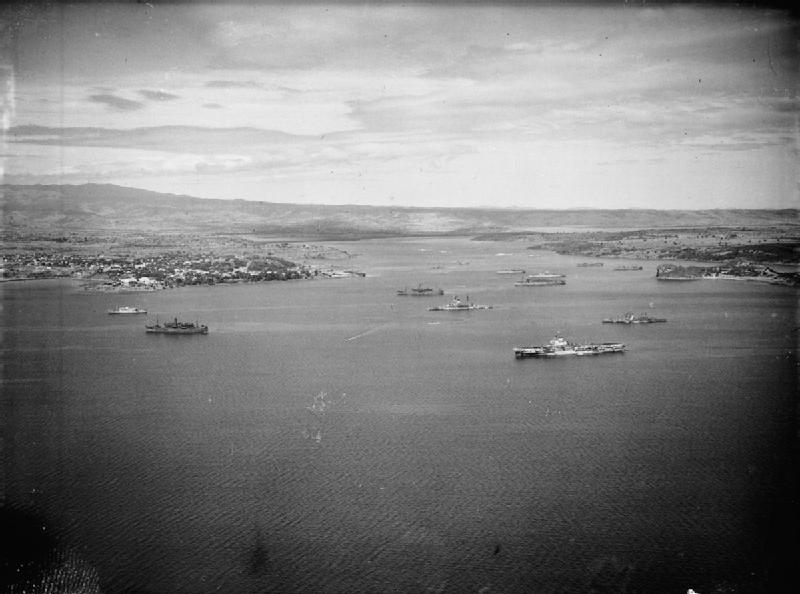
Allied ships in Diego-Suarez Bay at the end of Operation Ironclad

Duchess of Atholl next took part in the Allied invasion of Vichy French Madagascar. She left Liverpool on 21 March 1942 and joined Convoy WS 17, which took her as far as Freetown. From there she continued to Durban, where she arrived on 23 April. She left Durban five days later as part of the fleet for Operation Ironclad. The fleet landed Allied troops at Diego-Suarez on 5 May and had captured the town by 7 May. Duchess of Atholl left Diego-Suarez on 25 May and sailed unescorted back to Scotland, calling at Durban, Cape Town and Freetown before reaching the Clyde on 27 June.

Duchess of Atholl next sailed to Egypt packed with 4,114 troops. With her was her sister Duchess of York, equally packed with 4,004 troops. The pair left the Clyde on 17 July 1942 with Convoy WS 21P, which took the two sisters as far as Freetown. They continued independently via Cape Town and Aden to Suez, where Duchess of Atholl arrived on 2 September and Duchess of York arrived the next day. Three days later Duchess of Atholl began her return voyage to the UK, sailing unescorted and calling at Durban and Cape Town.

=== Final voyage and loss ===
On 3 October 1942 Duchess of Atholl left Cape Town unescorted for Freetown, from where she was to continue to the UK. She was carrying 534 passengers: 236 army personnel, 196 naval personnel, 97 Royal Air Force personnel, five nurses and 291 civilians, including many women and children.

At about 0755 hrs on 10 October the ship was about 200 miles east-northeast of Ascension Island, making a zigzag course, when the German Type IX submarine U-178 sighted her at a range of about 3 nautical miles (6,000 m). U-178 immediately dived and at 0829 hrs fired two torpedoes at the ship's port side. One missed, but the other hit the centre of Duchess of Atholl's engine room. The ship lost speed and made an uncontrolled 180 degree turn to port. As her engine room flooded, which soon caused the ship's electric lighting to fail.

At 0837 hrs U-178 fired two more torpedoes. Again one missed the ship but the other hit her in roughly the same place as the first. Duchess of Atholl's master, Henry Allinson Moore, gave the order to abandon ship. Three of the ship's lifeboats had been destroyed by the explosions and a fourth was too damaged to be used, but 26 were successfully launched.

At 0918 hrs U-178 fired another torpedo, which missed. At 0921 hrs the U-boat fired a final torpedo, which hit Duchess of Atholl's starboard side near her foremast. Captain Moore and his senior wireless officer threw all code books, classified documents and nine confidential bags of mail overboard before becoming the last personnel to leave the ship at 0945 hrs. Four crew had been killed but there were 821 survivors, and among them only two passengers and two crew were injured.

Some time after 1100 hrs U-178 surfaced. She approached some of the lifeboats, questioned four men about the ship's name, cargo and destination, and then left. Duchess of Atholl sank at 1125 hrs at 07°03′S 11°12′W.

=== Rescue ===
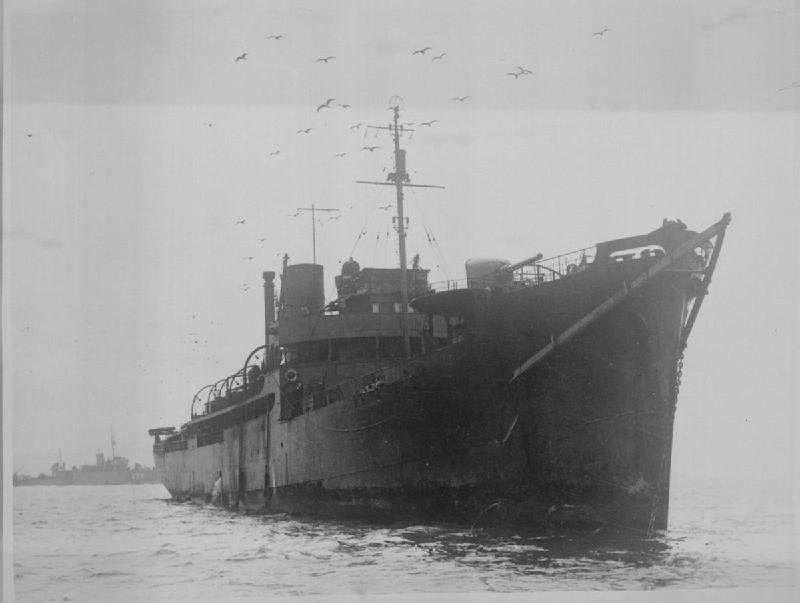
HMS Corinthian, converted from an Ellerman Lines cargo steamship, rescued all 821 survivors from Duchess of Atholl

The torpedo attack destroyed Duchess of Atholl's main wireless. Its operators used an emergency wireless to transmit distress signals, but the attack had also put its receiver out of action so they did not know whether anyone had acknowledged their signal.

One of the lifeboats was fitted with a wireless set. After abandoning ship the operators continued to send distress signals, and made contact with the wireless station on Ascension Island.

From Ascension Island the ocean boarding vessel HMS Corinthian, a converted Ellerman Lines cargo steamship, put to sea to find the survivors. Corinthian had direction finding equipment with which it tracked the survivors' wireless signals. At 1030 hrs on 11 October she sighted the lifeboats, and within five hours she had rescued all 821 survivors.

The Free French Flower-class corvette FFL Commandant Drogou escorted Corinthian to Freetown, where they arrived on 15 October. Duchess of Atholl's survivors left Freetown on 18 October aboard the armed merchant cruiser HMS Carnarvon Castle, a converted Union-Castle passenger liner, which took them to Glasgow.

== Bibliography ==
- Buchan, William (1982). John Buchan: a Memoir. Ashford: Buchan & Enright. p. 224. ISBN 978-0907675037.
- Gibbs, CR Vernon (1970). Western Ocean Passenger Liners 1934–1969. Glasgow: Brown, Son & Ferguson. pp. 50–51.
- Harnack, Edwin P (1938) [1903]. All About Ships & Shipping (7th ed.). London: Faber and Faber. p. 439.
- Talbot-Booth, EC (1936). Ships and the Sea (Third ed.). London: Sampson Low, Marston & Co Ltd. pp. 383, 433.
- Wilson, RM (1956). The Big Ships. London: Cassell & Co. pp. 36, 41, 50, 51.
