= Jacques Dupont (director) =

Jacques Dupont (French pronunciation: [ʒak dypɔ̃]; 21 April 1921, Ruelle-sur-Touvre – 10 March 2013) was a French film director.

== Life ==
Formerly of the IDHEC, and a specialist in exotic cinema, he appeared less comfortable in Les Distractions, in which he directed Jean-Paul Belmondo and Alexandra Stewart, than he did in evoking French volunteers in Korea in Crèvecoeur.

== Filmography ==
=== Short films ===
- 1946 : Au pays des Pygmées
- 1947 : Pirogues sur l'Ogooué
- 1949 : La Grande case
- 1953 : Stock car
- 1954 : L'Enfant au fennec
- 1955 : Coureurs de brousse

=== Full features ===
- 1950 : Savage Africa (Congolaise)
- 1955 : Crèvecoeur
- 1958 : La Passe du diable (The Devil's Pass) with Pierre Schoendoerffer
- 1960 : Les Distractions
