= RMS Empress of Canada (1928) =

Canadian ocean liner

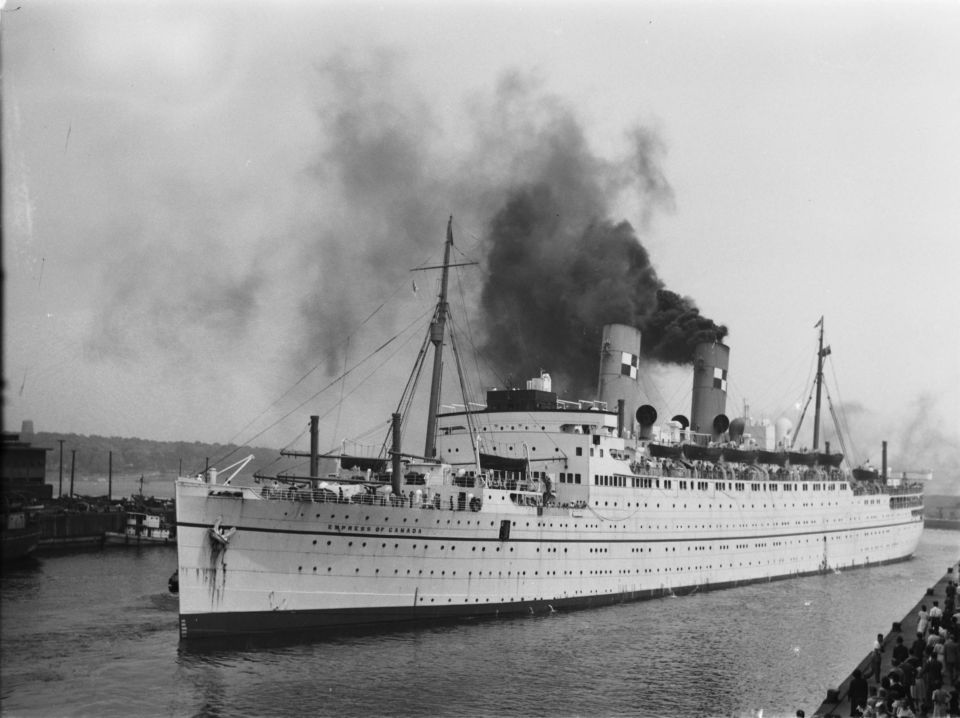
- Empress of Canada arrives in Montreal, 1947.

History
- Name: 1928–1947: Duchess of Richmond; 1947–1953: Empress of Canada
- Namesake: Duchess of Richmond
- Operator: Canadian Pacific Steamships Ltd
- Port of registry: London, United Kingdom
- Route: Liverpool to Quebec and Montreal (Apr-Nov), Liverpool to Saint John (Nov-Apr)
- Builder: John Brown & Company, Clydebank
- Yard number: 523
- Launched: 18 June 1928
- Maiden voyage: 15 March 1929
- Refit: 1946/1947
- Fate: Caught fire and capsized on 25 January 1953; Scrapped in La Spezia in 1954

General characteristics
- Type: Passenger liner; Troopship during Second World War
- Tonnage: 20,022 (1947, 20,325)
- Length: 601 ft (183 m)
- Beam: 75 ft 3 in (22.94 m)
- Propulsion: Geared turbines, twin screw propellers
- Speed: 18 knots
- Capacity: As built 580 cabin, 480 tourist and 510 3rd class passengers, 1947, 400 1st class, 300 tourist
- Crew: 510

SS Duchess of Richmond was an ocean liner built in 1928 for Canadian Pacific Steamships by John Brown & Company in Clydebank, Scotland. In 1947 she was renamed SS Empress of Canada.

== Duchess of Richmond ==
Duchess of Richmond was one of the several Canadian Pacific liners which were known as the "Drunken Duchesses" for their "lively performance in heavy seas." She was built as a sister ship to SS Duchess of York, SS Duchess of Bedford and SS Duchess of Atholl.

== Maiden voyage ==
She sailed from Liverpool at midnight on Saturday, 26th January 1929, with a full complement of passengers on a "shake-down cruise" to Gibraltar, Monte Carlo, Algiers, Tangier, Las Palmas, Sierra Leone, Freetown, to Dakar, and then back via Tenerife, Casablanca, Madeira, Cadiz and Lisbon to Liverpool early on Friday 8th March.

== Entered service ==
In March 1929 the 20,022-ton ocean liner began transatlantic summer service from Montreal Canada to Liverpool in the United Kingdom with winter service out of the port of Saint John, New Brunswick, Canada. On 27 April 1929, she ran aground at Saint John. Her passengers were taken off, and she was refloated the next day.

== Troopship ==
The merchant ship SS Duchess of Richmond disembarking soldiers at Algiers, November 1942.

During World War II, Duchess of Richmond was requisitioned as a troopship, and also played a role in transporting the Tizard Mission, which brought secret military equipment and designs from Britain to the United States. On 6 September 1940, she delivered the Mission, including highly secret and important equipment such as the cavity magnetron, to Halifax, Nova Scotia, Canada. The Mission then went onward by land to the United States. She also transported men to the fighting in North Africa, stopping briefly in Algiers to disembark troops on 14 November 1942.

== Empress ==
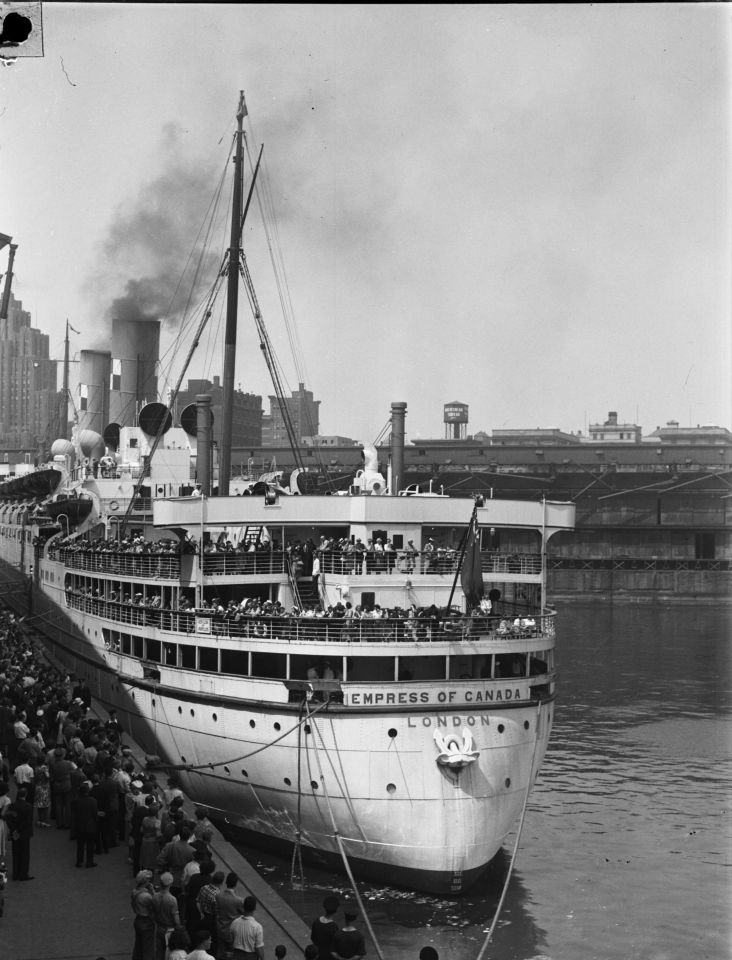
Empress of Canada at the Port of Montreal, July 1947.

War losses reduced the Canadian Pacific fleet considerably and post-war only the Liverpool to Montreal service was resumed. The two surviving cabin class Duchesses were upgraded to "Empress" status and refitted with accommodation for 400 1st class and 300 tourist passengers (down from the pre-war three class total of 1,570). In May 1946, Duchess of Richmond arrived at the Govan yard of Fairfield Shipbuilding and Engineering for her overhaul and refit. Upon completion she was renamed Empress of Canada on 12 July 1947 and sailed on Canadian Pacific's first post-war Liverpool–Montreal sailing four days later.

On 25 January 1953 Empress of Canada caught fire and heeled over against the dock wall at Gladstone Dock, Liverpool. Re-floated after being righted by parbuckling, the following spring she was taken to La Spezia, Italy where she was scrapped. The difficulty of her recovery has been likened to that of the ocean liner SS Normandie in New York Harbor in 1942 and the United States Navy battleship USS Oklahoma at Pearl Harbor in 1943.
