= SS Abyssinia =

British mail liner (1870–1891)

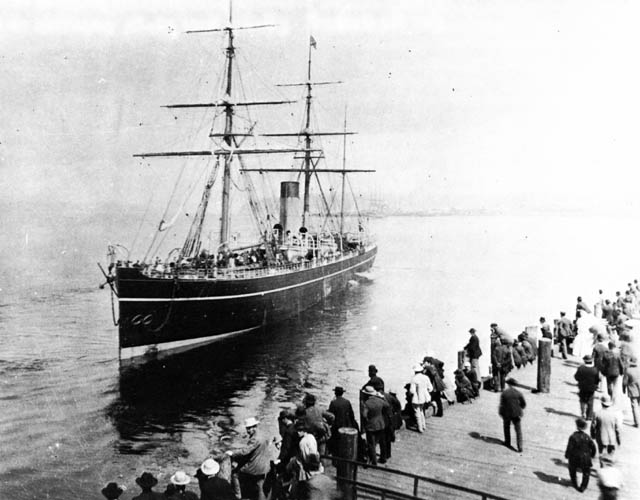
- SS Abyssinia at Vancouver, June 1887

History
- Name: Abyssinia
- Namesake: Abyssinia
- Owner: Cunard Line (1870–1880); Guion Line (1880–1891)
- Route: Liverpool-Queenstown-New York (1870–1886); Vancouver-Hong Kong-Tokyo (1887–1891); Liverpool-Queenstown-New York (1891)
- Builder: J & G Thomson, Govan
- Yard number: 110
- Launched: 3 March 1870
- Completed: May 1870
- Fate: Caught fire and sank, 18 December 1891 in the North Atlantic off Newfoundland.

General characteristics
- Type: iron-hulled steamship
- Tonnage: 3,253 GRT
- Length: 364 ft (111 m)
- Beam: 42 ft (13 m)
- Propulsion: steam engine
- Speed: 13 knots (24 km/h; 15 mph)

SS Abyssinia was a British mail liner built in 1870, and originally operated by the Cunard Line on the Liverpool–New York route. She later served the Guion Line on the same route and the Canadian Pacific Line in the Pacific. In December 1891, Abyssinia was destroyed mid-Atlantic without loss of life by a fire that started in her cargo of cotton, highlighting the danger in carrying both cotton and passengers on the same ship.

== Development and design ==
With the success of SS Russia, Cunard ordered a new fleet of iron express liners for the New York mail route. Abyssinia was the fourth of the five liners required for a weekly service. Abyssinia and her sister, Algeria were the first Cunard express steamers built to carry steerage passengers, a concept that was proved profitable four years earlier by the Inman Line. As completed in 1870, Abyssinia carried 200 first class passengers and 1050 steerage. She had a service speed of 12.5 knots and was a full knot slower than Russia. Both Abyssinia and Algeria were larger than their near sister, Parthia. Unlike Abyssinia and Algeria which were built in Glasgow, Parthia had been constructed in Dumbarton.

== Service history ==
Cunard employed Abyssinia on the Liverpool, Queenstown, New York service. All five of the new Cunarders on this route were quickly rendered out of date by White Star's revolutionary Oceanic of 1871. For example, Abyssinia and her sister burned 90 tons of coal per day as compared to 58 tons for Oceanic. While Inman and other rivals quickly installed compound machinery and modified passenger quarters to match White Star's new fleet, Cunard did not. On the other hand, Abyssinia's near sister, Parthia did utilise compound machinery. Due to such, Parthia only burned 47 tons of coal per day.

In November 1873, Abyssinia discovered the American ship R. Robinson abandoned in the Atlantic Ocean. Some of her crew were put aboard and R. Robinson was taken in to Halifax, Nova Scotia, Canada. Finally, in 1879 the privately owned Cunard line was reorganised as a public stock corporation to raise the capital needed to rebuild the fleet.

In 1880, Cunard sold Abyssinia to the Guion Line when that company needed a mail liner to replace the wrecked Montana. Two years later, Abyssinia finally received compound machinery. In 1884, she was transferred to the John Elder shipyard to partly finance Guion's new Blue Riband winner, the Oregon. Unable to make the payments, Guion returned its new record breaker to Elders and continued to operate Abyssinia. At the same time, Elders also acquired the former Cunarders Batavia and Parthia, Abyssinia's near sister, as trade ins for the sale of Oregon to Cunard. In 1885, Stephen Guion himself died and his firm was reorganised with Sir William Pierce of Elders as the new chairman.

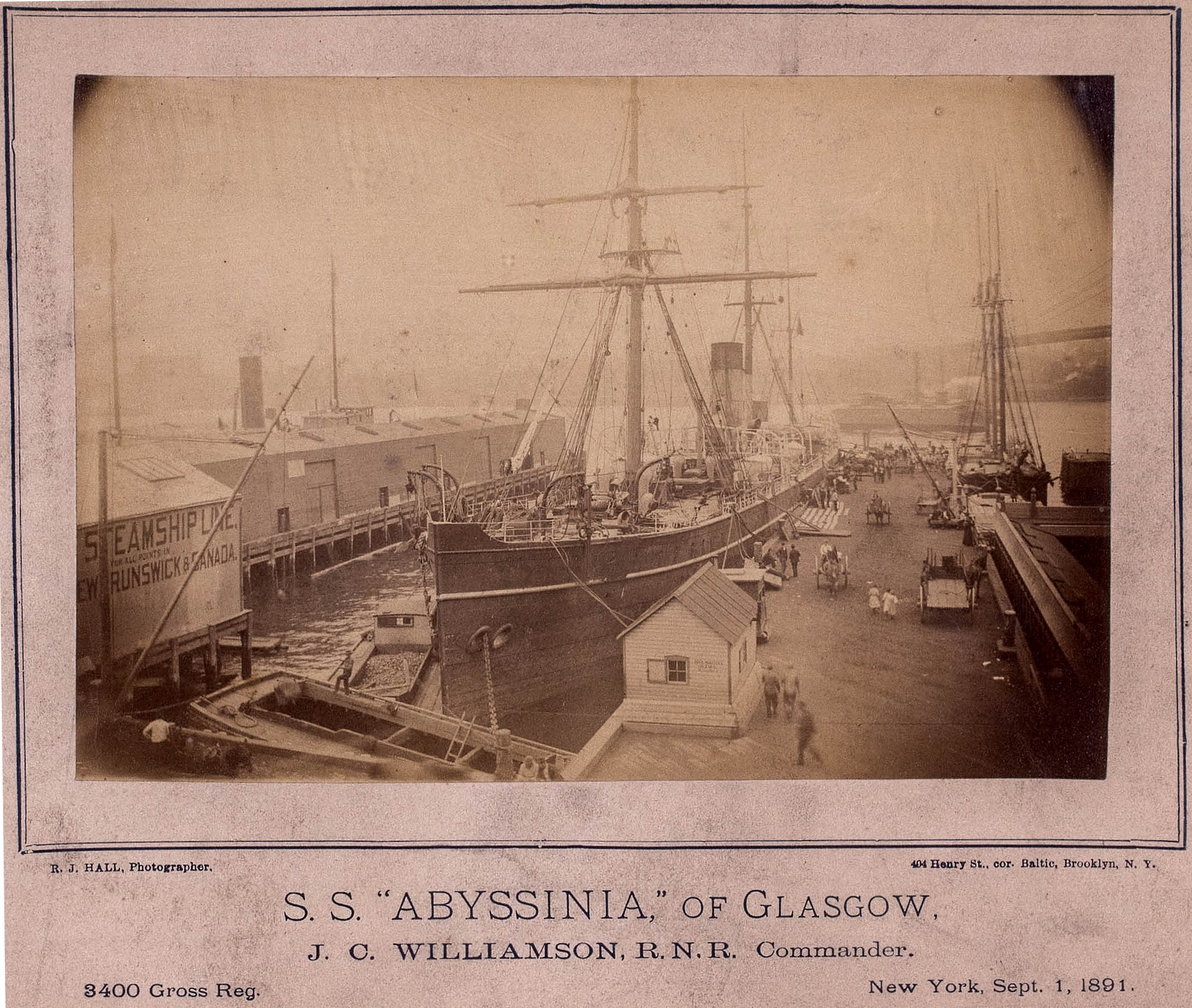

In 1887, Pierce chartered Guion's Abyssinia along with Elder's two other former Cunarders to Sir William Van Horne to begin steamship service in the Pacific, extending the Canadian Pacific Railway's transportation services from England, across the Atlantic to Canada by steamship, across Canada by railroad, and finally across the Pacific to Japan, China and India by steamship. Abyssinia opened the new Pacific service, with 22 first-class and 80 steerage passengers. She required only 13 days to reach Vancouver from Yokohama, arriving there on 13 June 1887, establishing a new trans-Pacific record. Abyssinia's freight shipment of silk and tea was transferred to rail, arriving in New York (via Montreal) on 21 June, and loaded onto another ship arriving in London on 29 June. Abyssinia was returned to Guion when Canadian Pacific took delivery on the three new "Empress" liners. She returned to Liverpool in September, after collecting a cotton cargo in New York.

Guion placed Abyssinia back on the Liverpool-Queenstown-New York mail service. Her first eastbound return trip cleared New York on 13 December with 57 passengers and 88 crew with various cargo including cotton. At 12:40 pm on 18 December 1891 off the coast of Newfoundland a fire broke out in her cargo hold which quickly overpowered her crew's firefighting efforts. Captain G.S. Murray ordered the ship to be abandoned. Lookouts on board the eastbound Norddeutscher Lloyd liner Spree spotted the smoke from Abyssinia and removed all passengers and crew by 4:15 pm. Abyssinia sank shortly after. Spree made port with the survivors in Southampton on 21 December.

== Other sources ==
- Vancouver: From Milltown to Metropolis, Alan Morley, Mitchell Press, Vancouver (1961), pp. 97–99.
- SS Abyssinia immigrant ship information
- Abyssinia on Chris' Cunard Page
