= RMS Empress of England =

- RMS Empress of England

History
- Name: 1957–1970: RMS Empress of England; 1970–1975 SS Ocean Monarch
- Owner: 1957–1970: Canadian Pacific Steamships; 1970–1975: Shaw, Savill & Albion Line
- Port of registry: 1957–1970: London, United Kingdom, 1970–1975: Southampton, United Kingdom
- Route: Liverpool–Greenock–Quebec–Montreal (1970– Cruising)
- Builder: Vickers-Armstrongs, Newcastle
- Yard number: 155
- Launched: 9 May 1956
- Completed: 19 March 1957
- Maiden voyage: 18 April 1957
- Out of service: 1975
- Fate: Scrapped at Kaohsiung, Taiwan

General characteristics
- Type: Ocean liner
- Tonnage: 25,585 GRT (1971, 25,971 GRT)
- Length: 640 ft (195.0m)
- Beam: 85.3ft (26.0m)
- Installed power: 30,000 shp
- Propulsion: Geared turbines, twin propellers
- Speed: 20 knots
- Capacity: As built, 160 1st class, 898 tourist class (1971, 1372 one class)
- Crew: 464

RMS Empress of England was an ocean liner built in 1956–1957 by Vickers-Armstrongs, Newcastle upon Tyne, United Kingdom for the Canadian Pacific Steamships. The ship was launched in 1956; and she undertook her maiden voyage in 1957 and was a near identical sister ship to Empress of Britain.

== Canadian Pacific ==
Empress of England was intended for sailing between Liverpool and Montreal. The ship was launched by Lady Eden, the wife of the Prime Minister Anthony Eden on 9 May 1956.

Empress of England's maiden voyage began on 18 April 1957. The ship sailed from Liverpool bound for Montreal, Quebec. Trans-Atlantic crossings continued until starting her last regularly scheduled crossing which began on 14 November 1969. The ship accomplished some cruises before she was sold in March 1970 to Shaw, Savill & Albion Line.

== Shaw, Savill & Albion Line ==
Shaw, Savill & Albion Line renamed her Ocean Monarch. Initially no structural alterations were made. On 14 April 1970 she departed Liverpool on a line voyage to Australia, arriving at Sydney, New South Wales, on 15 May. Two cruises to Japan (to coincide with Expo) were then undertaken, before the ship returned to Southampton. The vessel then proceeded to the Cammell Laird facility at Birkenhead for a major refit which involved turning her from a two-class transatlantic liner into a single-class cruise ship. This work included removal of the vessel's extensive cargo holds and cargo handling gear, installation of additional passenger cabins and the re-design of the ship's stern, to include a large swimming pool/lido area with a new bar/discothèque beneath.

The refit took far longer than was scheduled, so Ocean Monarch was able to complete just one cruise in October 1971, before departing for Australasia. She sailed from Southampton on 5 November 1971, bound for Sydney via Barbados, Curaçao, Panama, Acapulco, Los Angeles, Vancouver, Honolulu, Tokelau, Fiji and Auckland. Ocean Monarch was then based at Sydney. On 12 April 1972 she departed Southampton for a round the world trip, calling at numerous ports, among them Las Palmas, Cape Town, Durban, Fremantle, Adelaide, Melbourne, Sydney, Wellington and Auckland, before continuing back to Southampton via the Panama Canal. In late 1972 the vessel returned once more to Australia, for a program of cruises from Sydney to South Pacific ports, remaining throughout 1973.

In May 1974, Ocean Monarch left Sydney for Southampton for a further series of UK-based cruises. However, her schedule was disrupted by increasingly problematic main boilers, which defects would eventually seal the vessel's fate. Although the ship was sent back to Australasia in November 1974, mechanical failure in early 1975 caused a cruise to be cancelled, whilst the ship was dry-docked at Sydney and repairs were made.

The ship left Sydney on 26 April 1975 for the last time. Upon return to Southampton in May 1975 the vessel was once again dry-docked and subsequently offered for sale. Ocean Monarch was sold in June 1975. She left Southampton on 13 June 1975 bound for Kaohsiung in Taiwan where she was scrapped.

== See also ==
- CP Ships
- List of ocean liners
