= SS Statendam (1898) =

Ocean liner operated by Holland America Line, Allan Line and Canadian Pacific

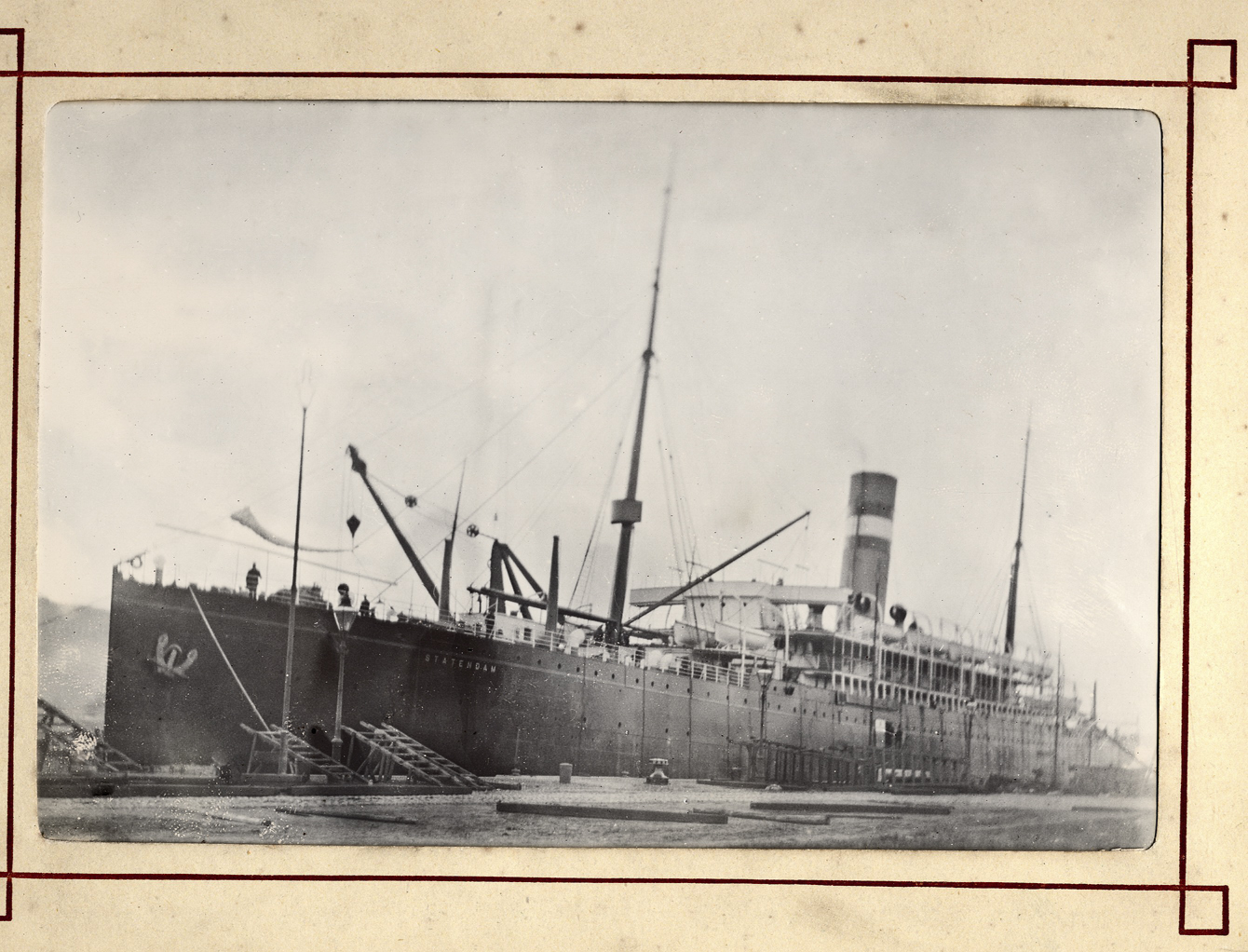
- The ship as Statendam

History
- Name: 1898: Statendam; 1911: Scotian; 1922: Marglen
- Owner: 1898: Holland America Line; 1911: Allan Line
- Operator: 1917: Canadian Pacific
- Port of registry: 1898: (Netherlands) Rotterdam; 1911: (United Kingdom) Glasgow
- Route: 1898: Rotterdam – New York
- Builder: Harland & Wolff, Belfast
- Yard number: 320
- Laid down: 6 July 1897
- Launched: 7 May 1898
- Completed: 18 August 1898
- Maiden voyage: 24 August 1898
- Out of service: laid up in 1925, & again in 1926
- Refit: 1911, 1919
- Identification: 1898: code letters PTBL; 1911: UK official number 129547; 1911: code letters HSKG; by 1913: call sign MJN
- Fate: Scrapped in 1927

General characteristics
- Type: 1898: ocean liner; 1923: troop ship
- Tonnage: 11,280 DWT; 1898: 10,475 GRT, 7,473 NRT; 1911: 10,322 GRT, 6,442 NRT; 1919: 10,417 GRT, 6,201 NRT
- Length: 515.3 ft (157.1 m)
- Beam: 59.8 ft (18.2 m)
- Draught: 28 ft 11 in (8.81 m)
- Depth: 23.8 ft (7.3 m)
- Decks: 3
- Installed power: 1,126 NHP, 6,700 ihp
- Propulsion: 2 × screws; 2 × triple-expansion engines
- Speed: 15 knots (28 km/h)
- Capacity: 1898: 210 × 1st class, 166 × 2nd class, 1,028 × 3rd class; 1911: 550 × 2nd class, 1,150 × 3rd class; 1919: 394 × cabin class; 542 × 3rd class
- Crew: 220
- Sensors & processing systems: by 1911: submarine signalling; by 1924: wireless direction finding

SS Statendam was a transatlantic ocean liner that was launched in Ireland in 1898 for Holland America Line (Nederlandsch-Amerikaansche Stoomvaart Maatschappij, or NASM). She was the first of several ships in the company's history to be called Statendam. She was NASM's first ship of more than 10,000 GRT, and she was the largest ship in the company's fleet until Potsdam was completed in 1900.

In 1911 Allan Line bought the ship and renamed her Scotian. Canadian Pacific took over Allan Line in 1916, and renamed the ship Marglen in 1922. She was scrapped in Italy in 1927.

== Building ==
Harland & Wolff built Statendam in Belfast on slipway number 6 as yard number 320. Her keel was laid on 6 July 1897, she was launched on 7 May 1898, and she was completed on 18 August 1898. Her registered length was 515.3 ft (157.1 m), her beam was 59.8 ft (18.2 m) and her depth was 23.8 ft (7.3 m). Her tonnages were 10,475 GRT, 7,473 NRT and 11,280 DWT. She had berths for 1,404 passengers: 210 in first class, 166 in second class, and 1,028 in third class. She had 220 crew.

Statendam had twin screws, each driven by a three-cylinder triple-expansion steam engine. The combined power of her twin engines was rated at 1,126 NHP or 6,700 ihp, and gave her a speed of 15 knots (28 km/h).

== Statendam ==
NASM registered Statendam at Rotterdam. Her code letters were PTBL. On 24 August 1898 she left Rotterdam on her maiden voyage to New York.

Early in her career, Statendam twice ran aground in Maassluis. The first time was on 30 November 1899, and the second was on 28 March 1900. In March 1904 she developed a boiler problem about 190 nautical miles (350 km) off the Isles of Scilly in the Celtic Sea. Because of this she made an unscheduled stop at Falmouth, Cornwall on 15 March.

By 1910 the Marconi Company had equipped Statendam for wireless telegraphy. On 22 January 1910 she left Rotterdam on her final New York voyage for NASM.

== Scotian ==
Allen Line bought the ship on 27 November 1910, renamed her Scotian, and in 1911 registered her in Glasgow. Her UK official number was 129547 and her code letters were HSKG. Allan Line had her refitted with berths for 550 passengers in second class and 1,150 in third class, which changed her tonnages to 10,322 GRT and 6,442 NRT. Also by 1911, her navigation equipment included submarine signalling.

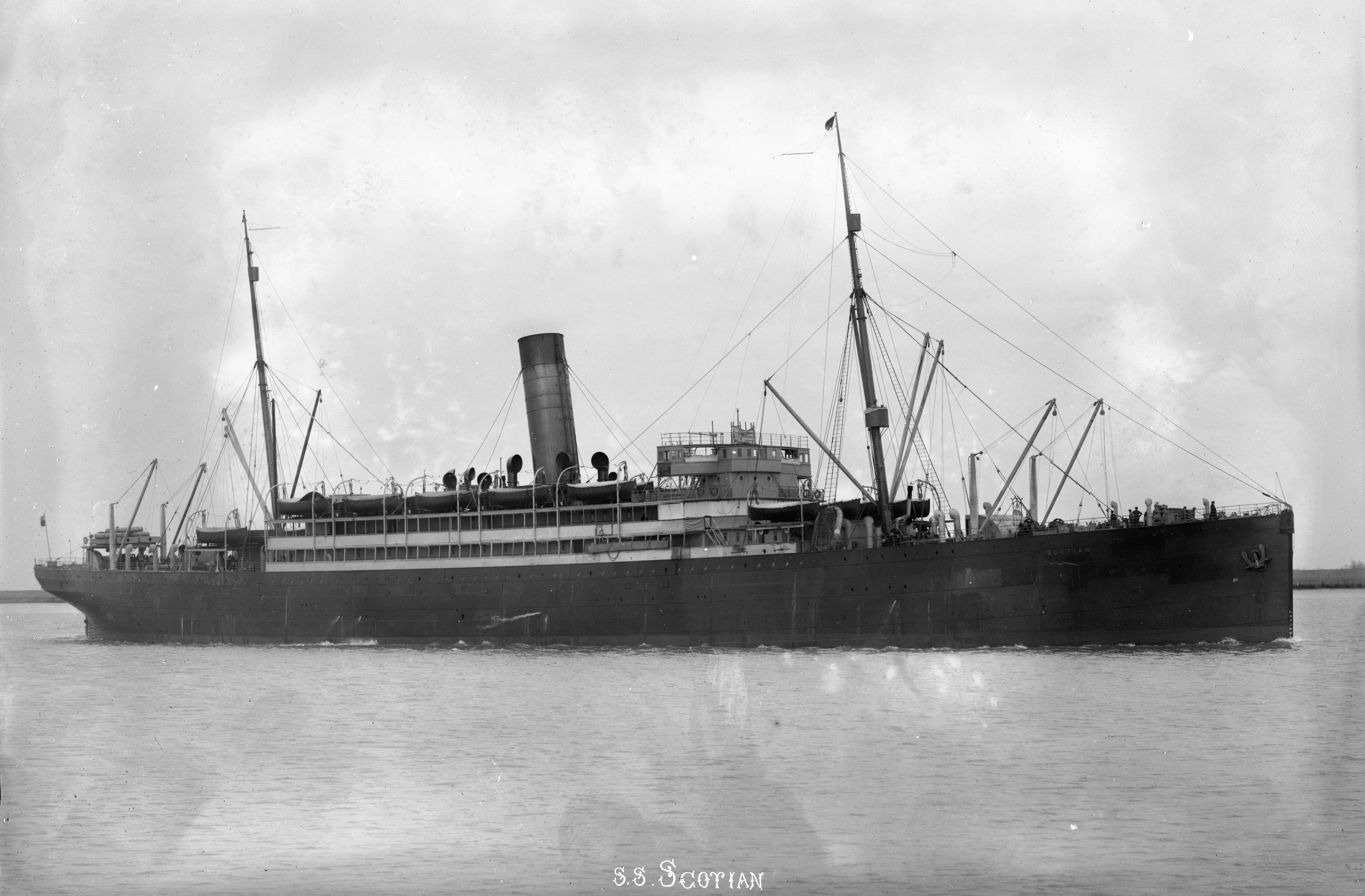
The Scotian on the river Scheldt

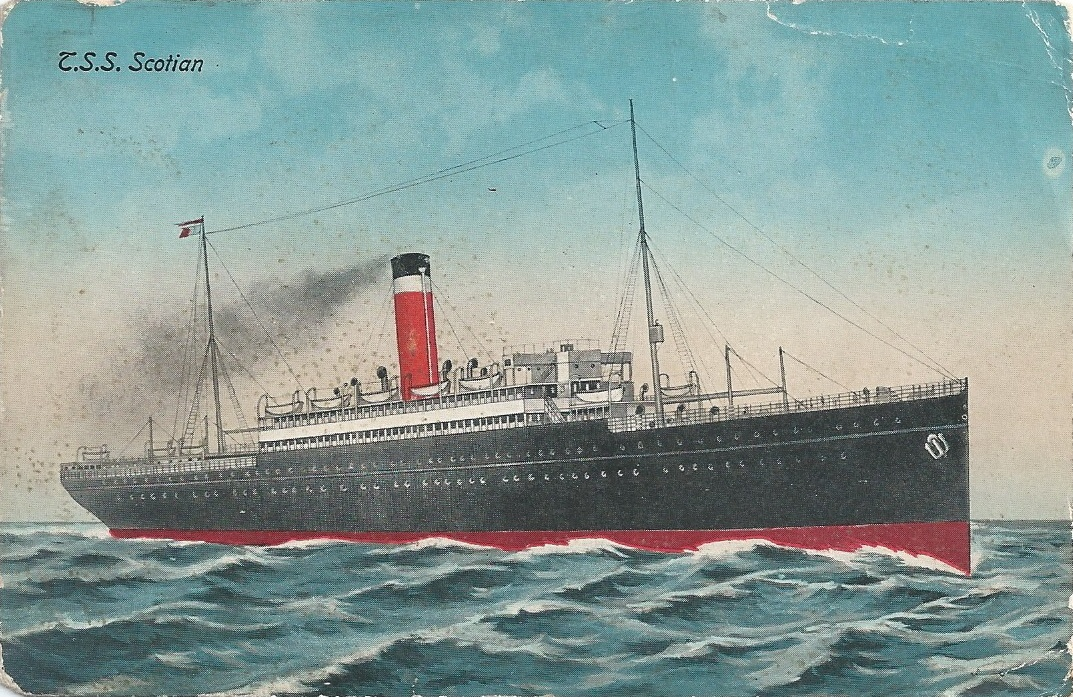
Postcard of Scotian in Allan Line colours

In March 1911, Scotian started sailing between Glasgow and Portland, Maine, via Halifax, Nova Scotia. On 6 May 1911 she started her first voyage from Glasgow to Montreal via Quebec. On 18 November 1911 she started her first voyage from Glasgow to Boston, and on 9 May 1912 she started her first voyage from London to Montreal via Quebec.

By 1913 Scotian's wireless telegraph call sign was MJN. In January 1914 Canadian Pacific chartered her for one round trip between Liverpool and Saint John, New Brunswick. On 21 August 1914 she began her final voyage from London to Montreal via Quebec. On her return voyage, she carried part of the Canadian Expeditionary Force to the UK. From November 1914 until March 1915 Scotian was anchored at Ryde, Isle of Wight, as a prison ship for German prisoners of war.

At midnight on 13 September 1916 Scotian was in Glasgow when the armed merchant cruiser HMS Mantua "touched her stem" when being warped across the dock. Neither ship seems to have been damaged.

In 1917 Canadian Pacific took over Allan Line. Allan Line remained Scotian's owner, but CP now managed her. On 4 September 1918 she left Liverpool on her first voyage to New York, and on 3 January 1919 she left Liverpool on her first voyage to Saint John, New Brunswick. CP was the pioneer of a new style of accommodation called cabin class. Later in 1919, CP had Scotian refitted to carry 304 passengers in cabin class and 542 in third class. This changed her tonnages again, to 10,417 GRT and 6,201 NRT. On 12 November 1919 she started sailing between Antwerp and Montreal via Southampton and Quebec. On 16 May 1920 she returned to the route between London and Montreal via Quebec. Between 1920 and 1921 the UK Government chartered Marglen for four voyages to Bombay as a troop ship.

== Marglen ==
On 16 November 1922 the ship was renamed Marglen. On 15 May 1923 she began her final transatlantic voyage, which was from London to Montreal via Le Havre, Southampton and Quebec. From 1923 she was a troop ship again, making round trips between the UK and Bombay. By 1924 her navigation equipment included wireless direction finding. In 1925 she was laid up at Southampton from 11 April until 14 October. After that she was a troop ship between the UK and Bombay again. From 11 April 1926 she was laid up at Southampton for a second time.

On 30 December 1926, Marglen was sold for scrap to DL Pittaluga. She was towed to Italy, leaving Southampton on 10 January, and reaching Genoa on 23 January, where she was broken up.

== Bibliography ==
- Haws, Duncan (1979). The Ships of the Union, Castle, Union-Castle, Allan and Canadian Pacific lines. Merchant Fleets in Profile. Vol. 3. Cambridge: Patrick Stephens Ltd. ISBN 0-85059-352-2.
- Lloyd's Register of British and Foreign Shipping. Vol. I.–Steamers. London: Lloyd's Register of Shipping. 1899 – via Internet Archive.
- Lloyd's Register of British and Foreign Shipping. Vol. I.–Steamers. London: Lloyd's Register of Shipping. 1910 – via Internet Archive.
- Lloyd's Register of British and Foreign Shipping. Vol. I.–Steamers. London: Lloyd's Register of Shipping. 1911 – via Internet Archive.
- Lloyd's Register of Shipping. Vol. II.–Steamers. London: Lloyd's Register of Shipping. 1917 – via Internet Archive.
- Lloyd's Register of Shipping. Vol. II.–Steamers and Motor Vessels. London: Lloyd's Register of Shipping. 1922 – via Internet Archive.
- Lloyd's Register of Shipping. Vol. II.–Steamers and Motorships. London: Lloyd's Register of Shipping. 1924 – via Internet Archive.
- McCluskie, Tom (2013). The Rise and Fall of Harland and Wolff. Stroud: The History Press. ISBN 978-0752488615.
- The Marconi Press Agency Ltd (1913). The Year Book of Wireless Telegraphy and Telephony. London: The St Katherine Press.
- Mercantile Navy List. 1913 – via Crew List Index Project.
- Wilson, RM (1956). The Big Ships. London: Cassell & Co.
