= SS Parthia =

Iron-hulled transatlantic ocean liner

SS Parthia/Victoria
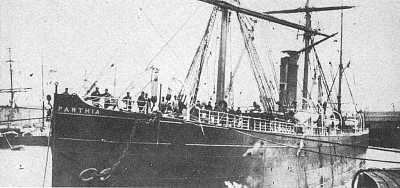
- SS Parthia of the Cunard Line.

History

United Kingdom
- Name: Parthia
- Namesake: Parthia
- Owner: Cunard Line; 1870–84; John Elder & Co.; 1884; Guion Line; 1884–92
- Operator: Cunard Line; 1870–83; Guion Line; 1885–87; Canadian Pacific Railway Company; 1887–91
- Ordered: Late 1860s
- Builder: William Denny and Brothers in Dumbarton
- Cost: £94,970
- Yard number: 148
- Laid down: 2 February 1870
- Launched: 10 September 1870
- Decommissioned: 1883 (by Cunard)
- Maiden voyage: 17 December 1870
- In service: 1870–83; 1885–92
- Out of service: 1883–85; 1891–92
- Renamed: Victoria
- Refit: 1892
- Fate: Rebuilt and renamed Victoria

United Kingdom
- Name: Victoria
- Owner: Guion Line; 1892; Northern Pacific Steamship Company; 1892–98
- Operator: Northern Pacific Steamship Company; 1892–98
- Route: Tacoma, Washington to Hong Kong; 1892–98
- In service: 1892–98
- Out of service: 1892 (was undergoing refit)
- Fate: Transferred to American registry in 1898

United States
- Name: Victoria
- Owner: North American Mail Steamship Company; 1898–1901; Northern Pacific Steamship Company; 1901–04; Northwestern Steamship Company; 1904–08; Alaska Steamship Company; 1908–52; Dulien Steel Products; 1952–54
- Operator: North American Mail Steamship Company; 1898–99; United States Army; 1899–1900; North American Mail Steamship Company; 1900–01; Northern Pacific Steamship Company; 1901–04; Northwestern Steamship Company; 1904–08; Alaska Steamship Company; 1908–41; U.S. War Administration; 1941–47
- Route: Puget Sound to Nome, Alaska (1900–08); San Francisco, California to Nome, Alaska via Seattle, Washington (1908–40?)
- Acquired: 1898
- In service: 1898–1924; 1924–35; 1938–47
- Out of service: 1924 (major refit); 1935–38; 1947–54
- Renamed: Straits No. 27
- Reclassified: Cargo only vessel as of 1940
- Refit: 1924
- Fate: Converted into a barge in 1954
- Notes: Extensive refit in 1924, converted to oil fired boilers, raised superstructure and enclosed bridge to the ship's hull.

Canada
- Name: Straits No. 27
- Owner: Straits Towing and Salvage Company; 1954–56
- Operator: Straits Towing and Salvage Company; 1954–56
- Commissioned: 1954
- Decommissioned: 1956
- In service: 1954–56
- Renamed: Straits Maru
- Fate: Sold to Japanese ship breakers

Japan
- Name: Straits Maru
- Owner: Japanese ship breakers
- Port of registry: Osaka
- Fate: Scrapped at Osaka in 1956

General characteristics
- Type: Ocean liner (1870–1900); Coastal passenger liner (1900–40); Cruise ship (1934–40?); Cargo ship (1940–54); Barge (1954–56)
- Tonnage: 3,167 GRT
- Length: 360.5 ft (110 m)
- Beam: 40.3 ft (12 m)
- Propulsion: Compound steam engines driving a single screw propeller. Re-engined with Triple-expansion steam engines in 1885.
- Sail plan: Barque (as Parthia)
- Speed: 13 knots (24 km/h; 15 mph)
- Capacity: 200 first class passengers and 1,050 third class passengers (as Parthia)

SS Parthia (1870–1956) was an iron-hulled transatlantic ocean liner built for the Cunard Line by William Denny and Brothers in Dumbarton, Scotland. Her sister ships were the Abyssinia and Algeria. Unlike her two sisters, Parthia was smaller, built in a different shipyard and had a slightly different funnel arrangement. The Parthia was retired by Cunard in 1883 and sold to John Elder & Co., who subsequently transferred her to the Guion Line. After serving with the Guion Line and operating on trans-Pacific routes with the Canadian Pacific Railway Company, she was refitted and renamed Victoria.

Under her new owners, the Northern Pacific Steamship Company, Victoria began operating out of Puget Sound in Washington state. In 1898, she was resold to the North American Mail Steamship Company and transferred to American registry. As a result of this, she was used as a troopship in the Philippine–American War, carrying troops to Manila in the Philippines. In 1900, she served with various owners along a route from Puget Sound to Nome, Alaska until she ended up with the Alaska Steamship Company in 1908. Victoria was then operated between San Francisco, California, and Nome, Alaska, via Seattle, Washington. In 1924, the Victoria, now 54 years old, underwent a refit, which added oil-fired boilers, larger superstructure and an enclosed bridge to her superstructure. A 1933 brochure by The Alaska Steamship Company gives the following information. Length: 370 feet (110 m). Breadth: 40 ft (12 m). Displacement: 6,670 tons. Gross: 3,868 gross register tons (GRT).

In 1934, Victoria inaugurated the first Alaskan cruise for her owners, calling to Nome and Kotzebue in Alaska. In 1935, Victoria was laid up in Seattle for three years and was converted to cargo only in 1940. From 1941 to 1947, the U.S. War Administration used her on 46 voyages to Alaska.

In 1952, she was sold for scrap to Dulien Steel Products, a firm on Lake Washington. Instead, she was converted into a barge and used by the Straits Towing and Salvage Company as the Straits No. 27 until 1956. Later that year she was renamed Straits Maru and scrapped in Osaka.

== History ==
Following the bankruptcy of its rival, the Collins Line, Cunard became the largest shipping company on the North Atlantic. In the late 1860s, Cunard management decided to order a trio of modern liners to hold their yet unchallenged title. The three ships would feature flush decks, an open bridge, three masts with barque-rigged sails and a single funnel. They would also be the first Cunard vessels to utilize bathrooms.

The first two liners, Abyssinia and Algeria, were constructed by J & G Thomson in Glasgow. The third and smallest of the three, Parthia, was to be built at William Denny and Brothers in Dumbarton. On February 2, 1870, the keel of the Parthia was laid. Little more than seven months later on September 10, the Parthia's completed hull was launched. Her fitting out was completed a few months later. Her total construction cost was £94,970.

=== Cunard service ===
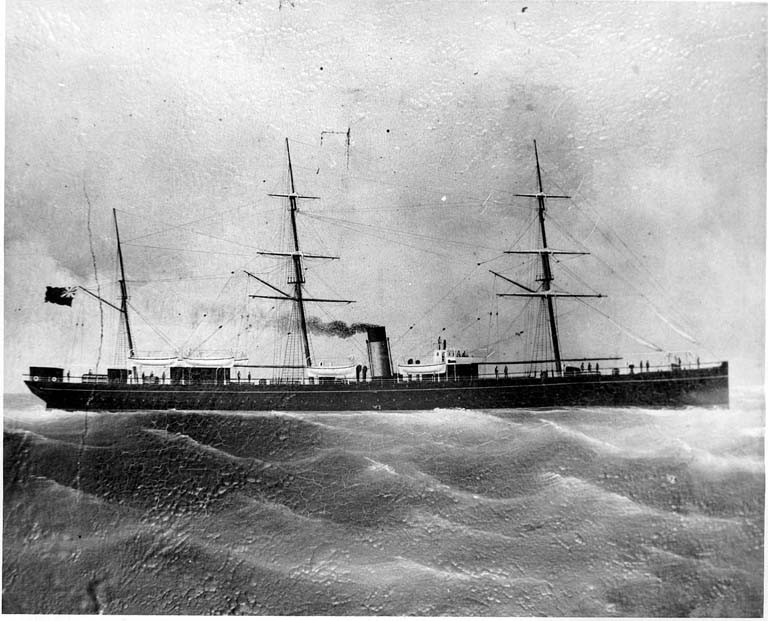
An illustration of Cunard's Parthia under steam.

On December 17, 1870, the Parthia embarked on her maiden voyage from Liverpool to New York City. Only able to travel 13 knots (24 km/h; 15 mph), Parthia was not able to take the Blue Riband, which was held at the time by Cunard's paddle steamer Scotia. Nevertheless, Parthia's performance was admirable and she quickly became the best vessel in Cunard's fleet and one of the top ocean liners on the Atlantic. Unlike her larger sisters, Abyssinia and Algeria, the Parthia was fitted with more efficient compound steam engines, reducing the space needed to carry coal. The extra space allowed Parthia to carry more freight. Another difference from her two sisters was her slightly thinner funnel.

In 1871, Cunard once again faced competition, when the White Star Line began operations with their new Oceanic. Oceanic was superior to Parthia in both size and passenger accommodations. Despite this, Parthia continued to hold her own. On 27 February 1872, Parthia collided with the British steamship Nina in the River Mersey. Nina heeled over onto the Spanish steamship Emiliano, severely damaging the latter, which had to be beached at Tranmere, Cheshire. In 1874, Parthia collided with White Star's Adriatic outside of New York, causing the latter to return to New York for repairs. Parthia however, received very minimal damage. In March 1880, Parthia began towing the partially flooded and damaged barque, Mary A. Marshall, to safety. 36 hours after Parthia began towing her, the Mary A. Marshall sank, but the barque's crew was able to be rescued. In November 1880, Parthia rescued the crew of the sunken James Edwards, after which, Parthia's third officer was awarded for his assist in the rescue.

At only nine years old, Parthia had already become an obsolete vessel in a world of rapid progress. Her life with Cunard was wearing thin. On October 27, 1881, Parthia was used as a troopship during the Mahdist War, backing up General Charles George Gordon with his attack on Khartoum. The following year, Parthia ran aground while attempting to avoid a collision with the liner St. Germain.

=== Guion service ===
In November 1883, Parthia made her 119th and final crossing for Cunard. After returning to Liverpool, Parthia was laid up. As part of Cunard's larger plans, Parthia was sold to John Elder & Co. in 1884 to help cover part of the cost of the new liners Umbria and Etruria along with covering part of the cost for purchasing the ex-Guion Line liner Oregon (1883). With the larger Umbria, Etruria and Oregon fulfilling Cunard's new ambitions, Sir William Pierce, the owner of John Elder & Co. had a new future in store for the old Parthia. Pierce planned on transferring the Parthia to his other company, the aforementioned Guion Line, for passenger/livestock service from Glasgow to Canada.

To prepare for her new service, the Parthia was re-engined with triple expansion engines and pressure boilers, which nearly cut her coal consumption in half. Shortly before entering her new service, Parthia was once again called for use in the Mahdist War in hopes of saving General Gordon, which ultimately ended in failure. After being returned to her owners, the Guion Line chartered the Parthia to Money Wigram and Company to transport immigrants from Sydney to Yokohama via New York and Suez. After this, she was placed on the Guion Line service from Australia to South America, via the Hebrides.

=== Transfer to the Pacific ===
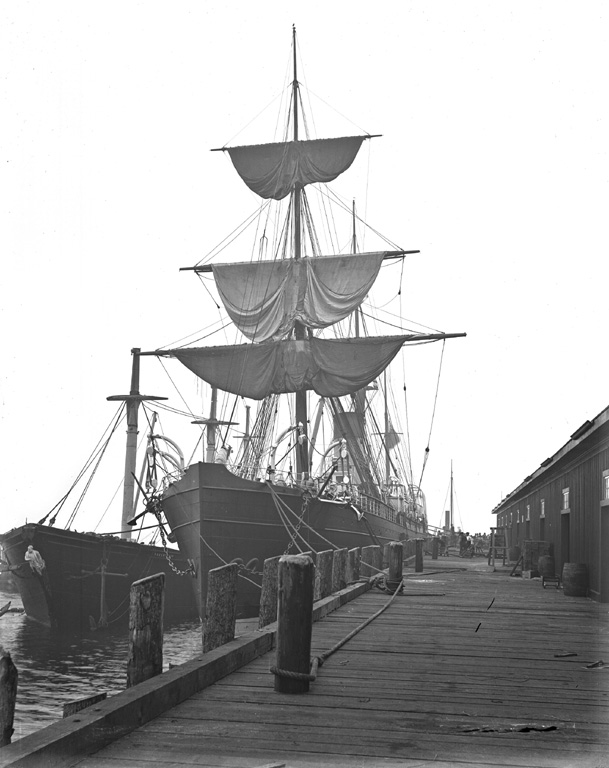
The Parthia in Vancouver while in service with the Canadian Pacific Railway Company

In 1887, the Guion Line chartered Parthia to the Canadian Pacific Railway Company, which used her to inaugurate its new transpacific service, while awaiting the delivery of its new vessels. The transpacific service was intended to link its railroad line to eastern Asia. She arrived in Vancouver, British Columbia on July 4 and began service as a transpacific vessel. After completing 20 voyages for Canadian Pacific between 1887 and 1891, Parthia was returned to the Guion Line. Canadian Pacific had been granted a subsidy agreement with the British government for the construction of three new "Empress" steamers, which would serve as mail ships in peace time and auxiliary cruisers in time of war.

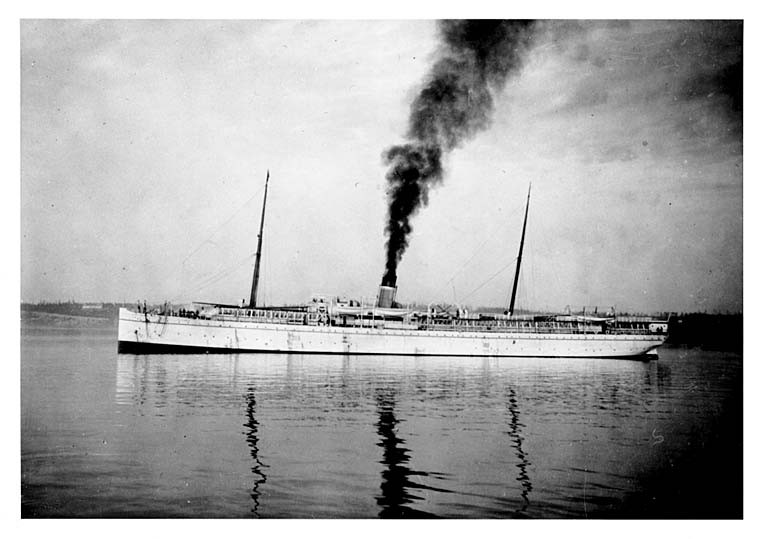
The Victoria with her hull painted white

The Guion Line returned Parthia to John Elder & Co., where the ship underwent a massive refit. Following the refit, she only sported two masts and was renamed Victoria. Guion subsequently sold Victoria to the Northern Pacific Steamship Company, which placed Victoria in service between Hong Kong and Tacoma, Washington. After only six years of service with the Northern Pacific Steamship Company, Victoria was sold to the North American Mail Steamship Company and was transferred to the American flag.

In 1899, Victoria was drafted for use as a troopship by the U.S. Government during the Philippine–American War. She made six voyages between the United States and Manila, the Philippines, before being returned to her owners. In 1900, Victoria sailed from the Puget Sound to Nome carrying hundreds of prospectors as part of the Klondike Gold Rush. In 1901, she was re-sold to the Northern Pacific Steamship Company, only to be resold three years later to the Northwestern Steamship Company. Under this new ownership, she permanently entered Alaskan service. Victoria's inch-thick wrought-iron hull proved excellent for ice-breaking capabilities. In 1905, Victoria was used as a blockade runner in the Russo–Japanese War, assisting the port of Vladivostok, Russia.

=== Alaska Steamship Company service ===
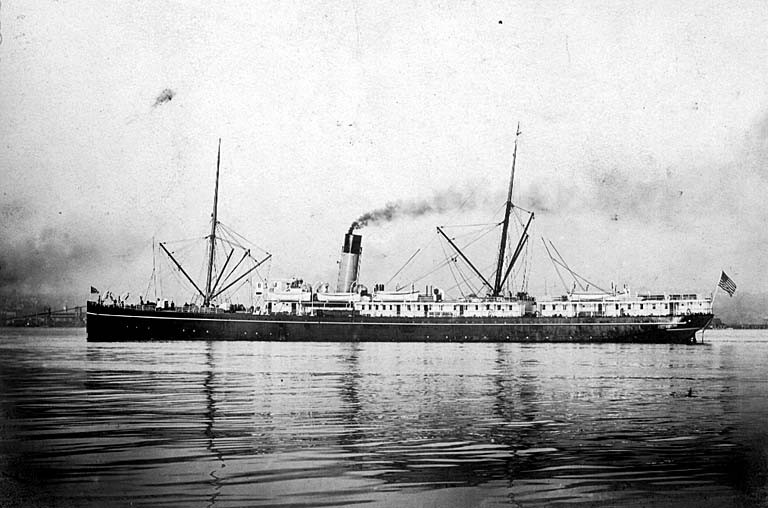
A side view of the Victoria before her 1924 refit

In 1908, the Northwestern Steamship Company was purchased by the Seattle-based Alaska Steamship Company. Now at an age of 38 years, Victoria was still deemed an important vessel by her new owners. Victoria was re-routed to serve between Nome and San Francisco, California, via Seattle. In 1910, the Victoria almost ran aground at Cape Hinchinbrook, Alaska, where the steamer Oregon (1878) had met her end only four years earlier.

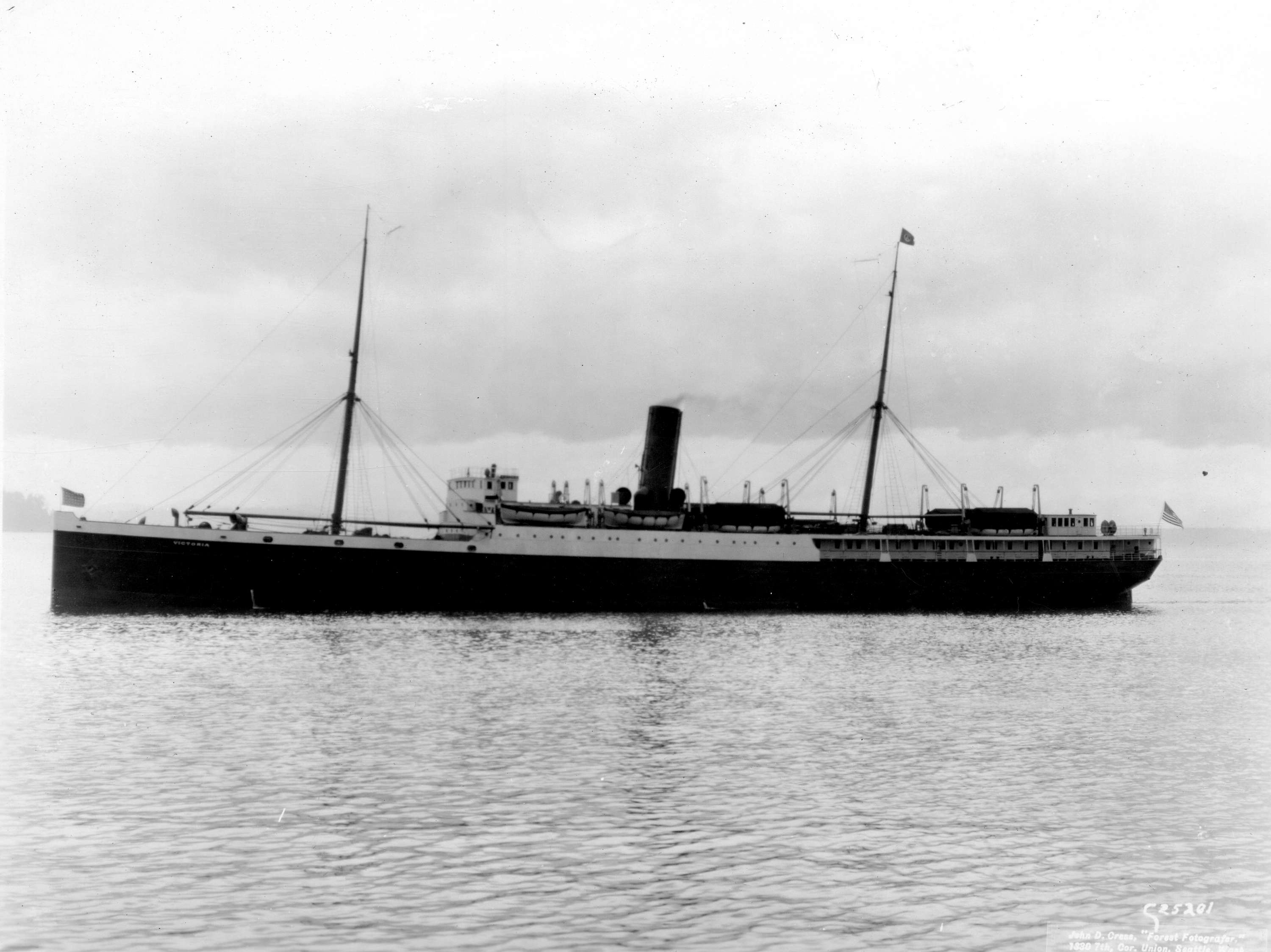
Victoria, following her 1924 refit. Her superstructure has been increased, her bridge has been fully covered and her boilers have been converted to oil fire.

During World War I, Victoria carried large quantities of cargo in transpacific service, earning her owners sizeable profits. Using the excess money earned during the war, Victoria underwent a major refit in 1924. The superstructure was increased and heightened, she was given extra decks, the bridge was closed off from the elements and she was re-engined and re-boilered to burn oil rather than coal. Despite being 54 years old, the Victoria emerged as a brand new looking ship. In 1927, Victoria's engine blew a cylinder cover, forcing her to be towed to Akutan, Alaska by a U.S. Coast Guard cutter. In 1934, Victoria embarked on the first Alaskan cruise operated by the Alaska Steamship Company. She called to the ports of Nome and Kotzebue and sailed to an Arctic ice cap within four miles of Wrangell Island in Siberia.

=== Final years ===
In 1935, time began running out for the Victoria. She spent three years being laid up in Lake Union, due to increased safety and fire precautions laid forth by the U.S. Government. After resuming passenger service briefly for two more years, Victoria was converted into a cargo-only vessel in 1940. When the United States got involved in World War II, Victoria was chartered by the U.S. federal government's War Shipping Administration between 1942 and 1947. Victoria completed 46 voyages to Alaska. When she was returned to the Alaska Steamship Company, her hull was found to be in remarkable shape. In 1950, Victoria's bell was returned to the Cunard Line, for use on their new passenger/cargo liner, the second Parthia (1947). The Victoria continued to serve with the Alaska Steamship Company until 1952. At this point, she had been serving for almost 80 years.

Victoria was sold to Dulien Steel Products for demolition in 1954 and she was laid up in Houghton, Washington. Realising her value, Dulien Steel instead sold her to the Straits Towing and Salvage Company of Vancouver in 1955. She was converted into a lumber carrying barge named Straits No. 27. The next year, she was sold to Japanese shipbreakers and renamed Straits Maru for her final voyage. She was towed to Osaka by the tugboat Sudbury and finally scrapped.

== See also ==
- List of ships built by William Denny and Brothers
- SS George W. Elder – a passenger liner on the Pacific Coast that also reached an unusually old age
