= Canada–South Korea relations =

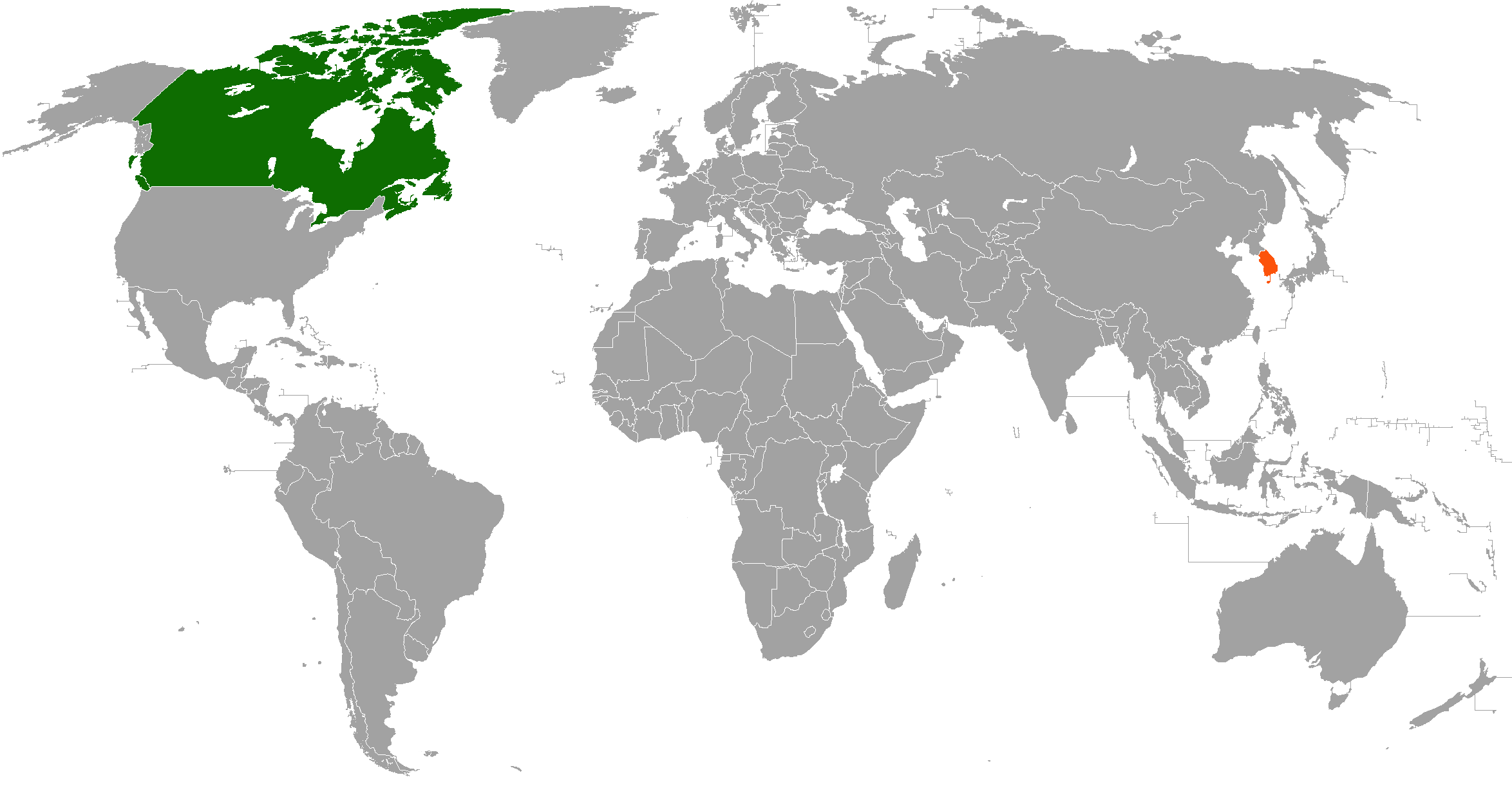

- Canada: South Korea

Diplomatic mission
- Embassy of Canada, Seoul: Korean Embassy, Ottawa

Envoy
- Ambassador Philippe Lafortune: Ambassador (Vacant)

Canadian embassy in Seoul, South Korea.

There are strong diplomatic relations between Canada and South Korea (Republic of Korea). Canadian soldiers participated in the defense of South Korea during the Korean War. Full diplomatic relations between Canada and South Korea were established on January 14, 1963. Canada has an embassy in Seoul. South Korea has an embassy in Ottawa and three Consulates-General, in Montreal, Toronto and Vancouver. Both nations are full members of APEC, OECD and the G20.

== History ==
Contact between Canada and the Republic of Korea dates back to the 19th century when Canadians were some of the first Westerners to arrive on the Korean peninsula, a majority of whom were Christian missionaries, though they branched out into other fields of work. Rev. Canadian James S. Gale (1863-1937) created the Korean-English Dictionary, which became the first and most essential tool for the scholarly study of Korea in the West, and did an independent translation of the Bible into the Korean language. Another Canadian, Dr. Oliver R. Avison, was the personal physician to King Kojong (1852-1919) and is considered the founder of modern medical knowledge in Korea. Dr. Frank Schofield, a British-born Canadian from Guelph, Ontario, played an important role in the liberation of Korea from the Japanese occupation. Schofield is the only Westerner buried in the patriot section in Korea's National Cemetery. Official contact began in 1947 when Canada participated in the United Nations Commission overseeing election in Korea, and Canada formally recognized the Republic of Korea in 1949.

When war broke out between North Korea and South Korea in 1950, Canada sent 26,971 military personnel to the Korean peninsula as part of a United Nations force, the third largest contingent behind the United States and the United Kingdom. Additionally, Canadians saw action in both naval and air forces with eight destroyers, 3,621 naval officers and men, twenty-two fighter pilots and several technical officers; whom were attached to the U.S. Fifth Air Force. Canada continued peacekeeping operations in Korea with the introduction of the Armistice Agreement. Due to the nature of the Korean War as the "Forgotten War", public awareness has been raised with the dedication of a national monument in 1997 - the Wall of Remembrance in Brampton, Ontario. 516 Canadians died in the war and 378 Canadians lie buried in the United Nations Memorial Cemetery in Busan.

In 2018, two Canadian nationals, Michael Kovrig and Michael Spavor, were detained in China after being accused by the Chinese government of espionage and endangering national security. On February 12, 2021, Canada and 57 other nations, including the US, UK, Australia, Germany and Sweden, jointly signed a declaration condemning the use of arbitrarily detaining people for political purposes. In response, China called Canada’s action a “despicable and hypocritical act”. The declaration was supported by 57 countries, though one historically democratic country not on the list of supporters is South Korea, which has been looking to build a stronger relationship with China. On March 22, 2021, Michael Kovrig’s trial began in Beijing behind closed doors.

=== Indigenous participation in the Korean War ===
Indigenous Canadians were among those who served in the Canadian Forces during the Korean War (1950-1953) who contributed to the United Nations military effort. Several hundred Indigenous Canadians served during the Korean War, although the precise number remains uncertain because military records did not consistently identify indigenous ancestry. Some Indigenous veterans had previously served in the Second World War, while others began their military careers during the Korean War.

Despite their military contributions, Indigenous veterans continued to encounter social and political inequalities in Canada. Their experiences illustrate the contributions of Indigenous communities to Canada's international military commitments, including its involvement in the defence of South Korea. Among these veterans was Sergeant Tommy Prince, an Ojibwe soldier from Manitoba who served in both the Second World War and the Korean War. During the Second World War, Prince served with the First Special Service Force, a joint Canadian-American military unit, and became known for his reconnaissance activities. His wartime service earned him several military decorations. Following the Second World War, Prince experienced difficulties adjusting to civilian life. He also became involved in Indigenous rights advocacy through the Manitoba Indian Association where he advocated for improved living conditions and more recognition of Indigenous people. In August 1950, he volunteered for military service in Korea and joined the 2nd Battalion, Princess Patricia's Canadian Light Infantry. Serving as Second-in-command of a rifle platoon. His responsibilities included reconnaissance and combat against opposing forces. He also participated in the Battle of Kapyong in April 1951, during which his battalion helped defend a strategic position against Chinese forces. The battalion received the United States Presidential Unit Citation for its service.

Indigenous participation also extended to the Royal Canadian Navy. Russ Moses, a Delaware member of the Six Nations of the Grand River in Ontario, served aboard the HMCS Iroquois During the Korean War. Before entering military service, Moses attended the Mohawk Institute Residential School in Brantford, Ontario, from 1942 to 1947. His family had experienced multiple generations of residential schooling, with his father and grandfather also having attended the Mohawk Institute. Moses joined the Royal Canadian Navy in 1950 at the age of 18. According to his son, John Moses, military service offered him a chance to leave behind the circumstances of his childhood at the Mohawk Institute. During his initial naval training, Moses travelled internationally aboard the HMCS Ontario before being deployed to Korea aboard HMCS Iroquois.

On October 2, 1952, HMCS Iroquois came under fire from a North Korean coastal artillery battery, killing three Canadian sailors and wounding ten others. Following his naval service, Moses served in the Royal Canadian Air Force until 1965. After leaving military service he entered the federal public service and documented his residential school experiences in a memoir. Moses's service provides another documented example of Indigenous participation in Canada's military operations in Korea.

Canada's participation in the Korean War became an important part of its relationship with South Korea, with both countries formally establishing diplomatic relations in 1963. The military contributions of Indigenous Canadians formed part of this shared history. The relationship continues to be commemorated through activities honouring Canadian Korean War veterans, including South Korea's Revisit Korea program, which invites veterans to return to the country, and annual remembrance ceremonies.

== Economic relations ==
The Canada-Korea Energy Forum has been held annually since 2009.

=== Trade ===
In 2014, South Korea was the 7th largest destination for Canadian exports the 3rd largest in Asia. In December 2009, Canadian Prime Minister, Stephen Harper, traveled to Seoul on his Asian Tour. The two countries talked on opening further trade relations. Despite suggesting trade advancements in technology and resources, South Korea did not commit to a lifting of the ban on Canadian beef. In October 2011, Canadian Agriculture Minister Gerry Ritz stated that he felt confident that South Korea would reopen the South Korean market to Canadian beef by year's end. The ban has existed since 2003.

Trade relations in the beef market have softened as of early 2012, ending the ban of imported beef. Canada continues to make significant strides in relations with Korea in many areas, including open free trade agreements.

On March 11, 2014, Prime Minister Stephen Harper and President Park Geun-hye announced that Canada and South Korea had concluded negotiations on the Canada–Korea Free Trade Agreement.

Canadian-South Korean bilateral trade reached (CAD) $21.9 billion in 2022. In the same year, Canadian export to South Korea were $8.7 billion, while South Korean exports to Canada reached $13.2 billion. Canada's main exports to South Korea were mineral fuels and oils (crude), cereals, wood pulp, mineral ores and meat. South Korea's main exports to Canada were vehicles, electrical equipment, machinery, oils (not crude) and iron/steel.

=== Investment ===
As of 2022, South Korea's cumulative investment in Canada amounted to $15.7 billion, Canada's cumulative investment in South Korea was $4.3 billion.

== Rejection of marijuana legalization ==
On October 22, 2018, the South Korean government snubbed Canada's legalization of recreational marijuana and warned South Korean citizens in the country that they must comply with South Korean law and will be arrested if they use or are in possession of recreational marijuana in Canada.

== Culture ==
The South Korean government maintains the Korean Education Centre (Korean: 캐나다한국교육원) in Toronto. Kim's Convenience is getting popular and recognised in Korea.

=== South Korea's Cultural Influence Over Canada ===
While the past relations between South Korea and Canada may have been shaped by feelings of eurocentrism, there is starting to be a cultural shift with the influx of over 200,000 Korean immigrants into Canada. Canada, as a cultural landscape, is rather fragmented in a way that makes it perfect to receive South Korean cultural exportations. With Hallyu, Canadians are being exposed to K-Pop, K-Drama, and K-Cinema, now more than ever, and their presence in the Korean cultural landscape is changing how Korean culture is perceived.

The role of diaspora in the public perception of contemporary Korean culture has historical precedent regarding the current dispersal of Korean culture pre-dating the Hallyu wave. Korean Diaspora have built systems through churches, self-employment groups, and informal networks of support. These pre-existing networks are beginning to shape the perception of Korean culture within Canada. This assisted in flipping the stereotypical role between cultural exporter and importer. Whereas globally, Korean media now has more power than Canadian media.

==== Korean Church ====
Sang Chul Lee was the First Korean pastor in Canada, and he founded the first Korean Church in 1965 in Toronto, called the “ Toronto Korean United Church.” Following his example, other pastors and congregations rose in the metropolitan areas of Vancouver and Toronto. These churches became cultural hubs and are remembered for their ability to help newcomers to Canada, from Korea, settle into the country. Within the Korean church community, the Korean diaspora cultivated a perception of being charitable and open to newcomers.^{[} Korean churches are visible evidence of the Korean community in a specific area: allowing newcomers and Canadian citizens to recognize the Korean communities presence. This includes the 26 Korean-Canadian United Church Ministers serving across Canada. The approach of these Ministers within the churches they serve is rooted in patience, honesty, and a desire to build and maintain relationships with the predominantly white Canadian community that continue to live in the surrounding areas.

==== Korean Media and Networks ====
Other diasporic networks include online chat forums and networking agencies that connect Korean Citizens with the diaspora community living in Canada. These networks also serve as nodes of exchange between Canadian and Korean cultures. Korean fans of K-drama were the first translators from Korean to English on online fan sites such as Viki Rakuten. Diasporic Koreans are given an incentive to learn more about Korean culture, history, and language through the circulation of these K-Media products, and their role in the circulation process. Diaspora communities would be the first to receive K-Media and then translate it into other languages for consumption by English speakers. Canadian fans of K-Media are tertiary responders to Korean culture and are called “transculturally affinite”. Hallyu and K-Media, give the Korean-Canadian diaspora an opportunity to reveal socially dominant cultural norms displayed in both K-pop and Western media. Korean-Canadian diasporic community practices shape Canadian perceptions around Korea and Korean-made media. Directly determining how Korea is viewed in Canada while also decolonizing ideas of media control and cultural influence.

Korean Popular Culture and Local Audiences

As Hallyu has reached Canadian audiences through television, music, and online platforms, researches have described how social media has helped young people in Canada discover and share Korean popular culture. One study notes that social media has contributed to the popularity of “transnational media culture produced in a non-Western region.” K-pop can be “meaningfully integrated into fans’ daily lives” through the ways audiences interpret and connect with the music and its cultural elements. Overseas audiences, too, act as active participants who engage and reinterpret Korean cultural content, rather than simply consuming it.

== Canada- South Korea Film and Entertainment ==
=== South Korean Film/ Television Shot in Canada ===
==== Goblin/ Guardian: The Lonely and Great God ====
Goblin, also known as Guardian: The Lonely and Great God, is a South Korean drama that aired from December 2016 to January 2017. It stars: Gong Yoo as the Goblin/ Dokkaebi Kim shin; Kim Go-eun as Ji Eun-tak, Lee Dong-wook as the Grim Reaper Wang Yeo, and Yoo In-na as Kim Sun. It ran for 1 season with 16 episodes and 3 special episodes, and was awarded 11 wins and 10 nominations across several different award shows and categories. Although mainly shot in South Korea, Old Quebec, a UNESCO World Heritage site central of Quebec, plays an integral role throughout the series, with several important scenes taking place within its streets. Studio Dragon, the production company developing the project, collaborated with Destinations Canada, Tourisme Québec, and the Québec City Tourism Office, to promote Quebec as a travel destination and to highlight the charm and romanticism of Old Quebec.

Shooting locations located in Old Quebec:

- Petit Champlain District
- Fairmont Le Château Frontenac
- Fontaine de Tourny
- Pierre-Dugua-De-Mons Terrace
- La Boutique De Noel
- Parc Samuel-Hollande

==== Can This Love be Translated? ====
Can This Love Be Translated? is a South Korean Netflix miniseries released on January 16th 2026. It stars: Kim Seon-ho as interpreter Joo Ho-jin, Go Youn-jung as aspiring actress Cha Mu-hee, and Sôta Fukushi as famous actor Hiro Kurosawa. It has 12 episodes all released on the same day on the streaming service Netflix. The series shot episodes all over the world including Japan, Italy, Canada and South Korea. Pre-production, production, and wrap for the scenes shot in Alberta, Canada began from August 18, 2024 and finished on November 25, 2024. They filmed across several locations within Alberta: Banff, Calgary, Canmore, Drumheller and Kananaskis.

Shooting Locations:

- Banff
  - Banff Avenue
  - Banff Central Park Pedestrian Bridge
- Calgary
  - Crossroads Market
  - Stephen Avenue
  - Heritage Park
  - Mount Pleasant View Point
  - Baker and Sien Lok parks
- Canmore
  - Main Street
  - Quarry Lake Park
  - Three Sisters Parkway
- Drumheller
  - Horseshoe Canyon
- Kananaskis
  - Upper Lake Kananaskis

=== Canadian Film/ Television Shot in South Korea ===
==== Riceboy Sleeps ====
Riceboy Sleeps is a Canadian film written and directed by Anthony Shim, that was first shown at the Toronto International Film Festival September 2022. It stars: Choi Seung-yoon as Choi So-Young and Ethan Hwang as Choi Dong-hyun/ David Korean immigrants, with Director Shim playing as So-Young’s love interest Simon, a Korean transnational adoptee. The film garnered 31 awards and 21 nominations throughout different categories and film festivals across the globe. The film was supported by Telefilm Canada, Crave and The Harold Greenberg Fund. Anthony Shim is a director based in Vancouver, BC and is the main location where the first half of the movie was filmed, "in and around Vancouver". In the second half of the film, the two main characters travel back to South Korea, where the film was shot in Shim’s own grandfather’s hometown in rural South Korea.

==== In Her Place (2014) ====
In her Place is a joint Canadian-South Korean film co-written and directed by Albert Shin and co-written by Pearl Harding-Hao. The film was released at the Toronto International Film Festival in September of 2014, and in South Korea in December 2015. It stars: Gil Hae-yeon as Mother, Yoon Da-gyeong as Woman, and Ahn Ji-hye as Girl. The film collected 5 wins and 10 nominations throughout several international film festivals and the Canadian Screen Awards. Although being a Canadian film with a Canadian film director, In Her Place is shot entirely in South Korea with South Korean actors rather than Korean-Canadian actors. The location is unnamed, however Shin stated in an interview that it is a family farm of his uncle’s located in rural South Korea. He further mentions that although he is a Second generation Korean in Canada he felt the need to make a film in Korea, and upon traveling there, learned of a similar story from a local which his screenplay is based on.

=== Tourism ===
==== Goblin ====
In 2016, when Goblin released, Old Quebec saw an increase in tourists flocking to the locations to see the famous settings in person. The hotel featured in the series, Fairmont Le Château Frontenac, began to offer a “Goblin package” for fans of the series to stay within the iconic hotel. Travel agencies like Tripadvisor, offer tours surrounding the city and aimed at specifically touring the famous locations such as the red door in the Petit Champlain District as well as the famous hotel. Several websites also offer map's to visitors hoping to see all the locations within the iconic city and its landscapes.

==== Can This Love be Translated? ====
In the beginning of 2026, Netflix released Can This Love be Translated? And since then, Alberta has seen an increase in tourism throughout Banff, Canmore, Calgary, and more. Tourism Canada, and Tripbitoz, a Korean online travel agency, jointly promoted tourism to Alberta for these location tours. As a result, it nearly doubled the accommodation bookings for hotels, and increased the number of visitors interested in the Canadian scenery experienced by the main leads of the series. Travel Alberta has posted a roadmap of some of the locations within the series totaling a 5 day road trip, with approximately 579 km traveled, taking you from Calgary, to the badlands of Alberta, and finally to Banff and the Canadian Rockies.

=== Collaboration ===
In April 1995, Canada and South Korea signed a Memorandum of Understanding between the Government of Canada and the Government of the Republic of Korea on Television Co-Production. This covered any projects, including animation and documentaries, produced for television between the two countries, with a joint required participation between them at 30% Bipartite, meaning that 30% of any total budget between a joint production must be covered by each country, and 20% multipartite, meaning if there are three or more countries 20% must be covered by each participating country. The memorandum highlights that any work done on any coproduction, from sound design, laboratory work, production, or dubbing/ subbing must be done in either country unless required with permission.

In April 2026, the Government of Canada and the Republic of Korea jointly signed a modernized audiovisual coproduction treaty. Their aim is to deepen their shared partnership and increase collaboration on audiovisual projects. This comes as a replacement to the previously held 1995 memorandum of understanding on television coproduction between the two countries. By introducing a modernized framework, they hope to “expand coproduction opportunities by including film and digital media in its scope”.

== Korean language and community activities ==
Korean Cultural Centre Canda

Established in 2016 under the Embassy of the Republic of Korea, the Korean Centre Canada organizes exhibitions, performances, film screenings, festivals, and language programs. Its activities include partnerships with Canadian arts and cultural organizations.

During September 2025, the Korean Cultural Centre Canada held a Korean Culture Day program in the Northwest Territories. Activities took place at three schools in Yellowknife and Fort Providence and included K-pop dance, Taekwondo, and Korean cooking classes. The centre also organized a Korean food workshop and a film screening for the wider Yellowknife community.

Year of Cultural Exchanges

In 2022, Canada and South Korea designated 2024-25 as the Year of Cultural Exchanges to mark the 60th anniversary of diplomatic relations. The two countries signed a memorandum of understanding in June 2024 to support exchanges in areas which include culture, heritage, creative industries, and sport. The purpose was intended to encourage dialogue and connections between people and organizations in both countries.

Korean Cultural Heritage Festival

In Vancouver, the Korean Cultural Heritage Festival has been held annually at Swangard Stadium in Burnaby. Organized by the Korean Cultural Heritage Society, the event showcases Korean culture through traditional performances, food, and contemporary entertainment. In August 2024, the 22nd annual festival had approximately 20,000 participants. The 2025 program included more events including traditional Korean dance, taekwondo demonstrations, and a K-pop dance competition.

AsiaFest

AsiaFest is a multicultural festival in Edmonton, Alberta, featuring performers and community groups from a wide range of Asian backgrounds. The festival began in Edmonton in 2022 as a community event organized by newcomers and long-time residents. It has since expanded to include food vendors, local businesses, artists, and performers representing various Asian cultures. The event provides a local setting in which Korean cultural groups can perform alongside other community organizations. Korean performers have included HanBeat Samulnori, a traditional Korean percussion and dance group, and Krescent, an Edmonton-based Korean dance group. Their festival appearances have brought Korean music and dance to a wider community of people interested in Asian Culture.

The University of Alberta

The University of Alberta’s Korean language program has also become a centre of cultural activities in Edmonton. Being established since 2007, the program had more than 600 students enrolled in 31 classes by 2024. Its activities extend beyond language instruction and include cultural festivals, speech contests, K-pop festivals, and conversation clubs. The active program has also connected students with members of the local Korean community through volunteer projects. These have included mentoring Korean youth at summer camps, helping Korean seniors learn to use computers and smartphones, and providing English-language instructions to Korean immigrants and their families. More than 100 volunteers take part in this program each year

== See also ==
- Canada–Korea Free Trade Agreement
- Canada–North Korea relations
- Foreign relations of Canada
- Foreign relations of South Korea
  - Indo-Pacific Strategy of South Korea
- Korean Canadian
- Asia–Canada relations
