= HMS Swale (K217) =

Frigate of the Royal Navy

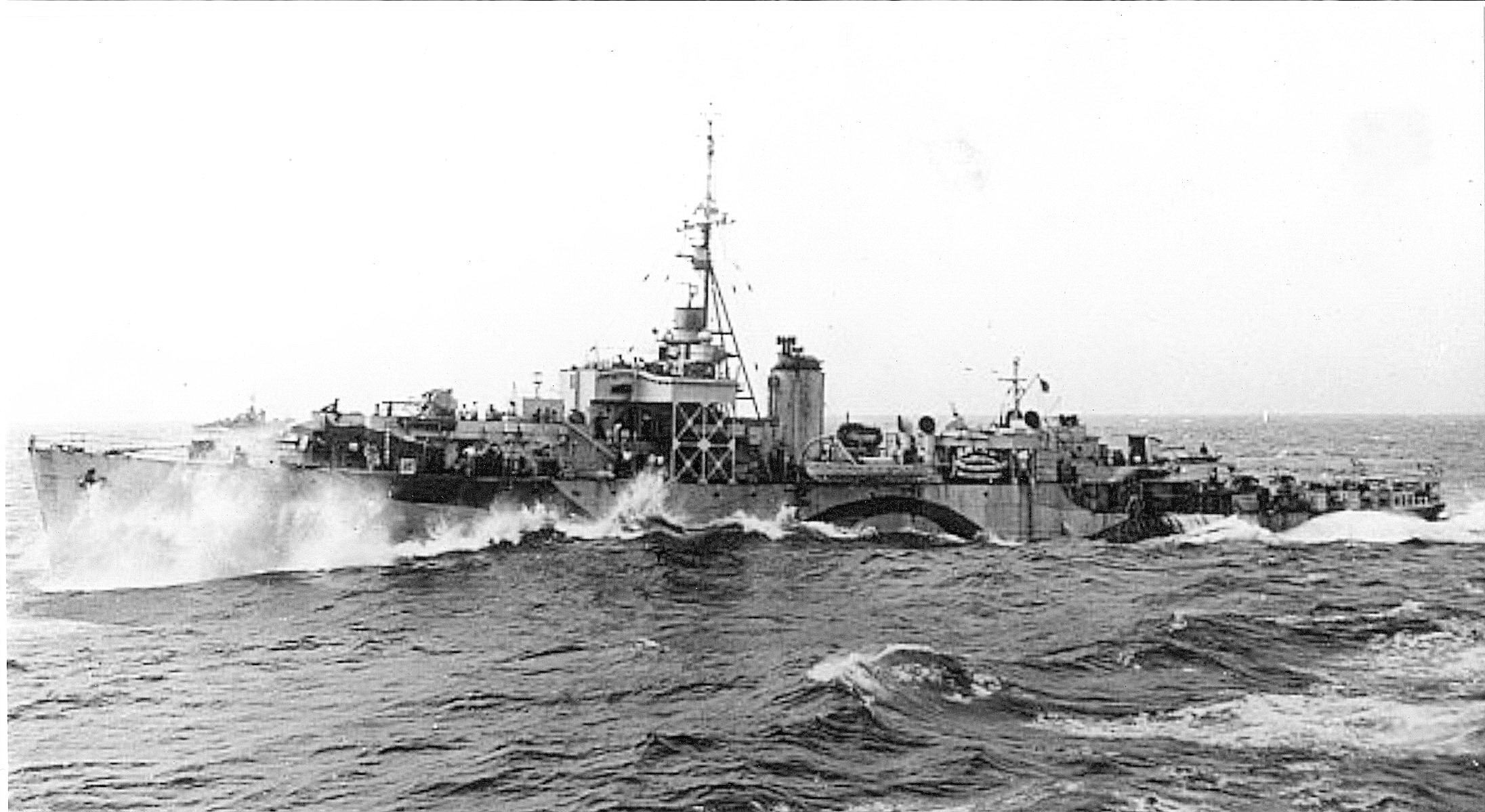
- HMS Swale with 'dazzle' paintwork

History

United Kingdom
- Name: Swale
- Namesake: River Swale
- Builder: Smiths Dock Co., South Bank-on-Tees
- Laid down: 19 August 1941
- Launched: 16 January 1942
- Commissioned: 24 June 1942
- Identification: Pennant number: K217
- Fate: Transferred on 26 July 1945 to South Africa as HMSAS Swale (K217). Returned to RN in January 1946. Scrapped on 26 February 1955.

General characteristics
- Class & type: River-class frigate
- Displacement: 1,370 long tons (1,390 t); 1,830 long tons (1,860 t) (deep load)
- Length: 283 ft (86.26 m) p/p; 301.25 ft (91.82 m)o/a
- Beam: 36.5 ft (11.13 m)
- Draught: 9 ft (2.74 m); 13 ft (3.96 m) (deep load)
- Propulsion: 2 x Admiralty 3-drum boilers, 2 shafts, reciprocating vertical triple expansion, 5,500 ihp
- Speed: 20 knots (37.0 km/h)
- Range: 440 long tons (450 t; 490 short tons) oil fuel; 7,200 nautical miles (13,334 km) at 12 knots (22.2 km/h)
- Complement: 107
- Armament: 2 × QF 4 in (102 mm) /40 Mk.XIX guns, single mounts CP Mk.XXIII; up to 10 x QF 20 mm Oerlikon A/A on twin mounts Mk.V and single mounts Mk.III; 1 × Hedgehog 24 spigot A/S projector; up to 150 depth charges

HMS Swale (K217) was a River-class frigate of the Royal Navy (RN) from 1942 to 1955, loaned to the South African Navy for six months at the end of the Second World War.

== Construction ==
Swale was built to the RN's specifications as a Group I River-class frigate. She was laid down at Smiths Dock Co., South Bank-on-Tees on 19 August 1941 and launched on 16 January 1942. The ship was commissioned into the RN on 24 June 1942 as K 217 and named for the River Swale in Yorkshire, England.

== War service ==
=== Early days ===
Swale saw extensive service on convoy escort missions and experienced some of the worst days of the Battle of the Atlantic. In March 1943 she was SO (Senior Officer's ship) of the Escort Group (EG) B5, escorting the slow convoy SC 122 from New York to Liverpool. Of the 51 merchant ships in the convoy, 10 returned to port unable to ride a violent storm; three days later another eight were sunk by U-boats.

Swale was to have better fortunes two months later. Escorting slow convoy ONS 7 bound for Halifax, Canada, she sank the German submarine U-657 off Cape Farewell, Greenland on the night of 17 May. The U-boat had earlier torpedoed the 5,196 GRT steamer Aymeric, the last British cargo ship in the Atlantic to be sunk that month, claiming the lives of 53 men. Under the command of Lieutenant Commander John Jackson, DSC, RNR, Swale moved 6,000 metres (6,600 yd) astern of the doomed Aymeric and made ASDIC (sonar) contact. After a succession of depth charge and Hedgehog attacks, she was rewarded with the sound of several loud explosions and the appearance of burning oil on the surface. The convoy continued to Canada without further loss.

=== Convoy Faith episode ===
On 10 July 1943 Swale sailed Gibraltar to rendezvous with the small, fast Convoy Faith (one of the 'Winston Specials') en route from Greenock in Scotland to Freetown, Sierra Leone. The convoy had comprised two troopships, the California and the Canadian Pacific liner Duchess of York, and the transport Port Fairy, (which was carrying ammunition), escorted by three warships. At about 2000 hrs on 11 July while 300 miles (480 km) west of Vigo, the convoy was subjected to a devastating air attack by three Focke-Wulf Fw 200 Condor aircraft from Merignac airfield near Bordeaux. By the time Swale arrived at 2235 hrs, both California and Duchess of York had been hit, set on fire, and abandoned, to be sunk later by torpedoes from their escorts. Swale too was attacked by the Condors, bombs falling just 20 yards (18 m) astern. After making an A/S sweep, Swale was ordered to escort Port Fairy, which had escaped unscathed, to Casablanca, ahead of the other escorts which were still searching for survivors. On the evening of the next day, the two ships were attacked by two Fw 200s returning from a reconnaissance mission off the Portuguese coast. Despite the interception and strafing of the Condors by two US Navy PBY Catalinas Port Fairy was hit on her port quarter by a 50 kg (110 lb) bomb which started a fire next to her magazine. Swale came alongside, took off 64 survivors from the two troopships together with eight passengers, and helped extinguish the blaze with her hoses. Port Fairy was repaired at Casablanca and remained in service until 1965.

=== Last success ===
On 6 April 1944, while escorting the slow convoy SC 156 from Halifax, Canada to Loch Ewe, Scotland, Swale sank U-302 with depth charges northwest of the Azores after the U-boat penetrated the escort screen and sank the Norwegian merchantmen Ruth 1 and South America.

== Post-war service ==
Swale was loaned to the South African Navy on 26 June 1945 as HMSAS Swale (K217) but returned to the RN in January 1946. She was scrapped on 26 February 1955.
