= Convoy Faith =

Small, fast Allied convoy of World War II

- Part of the Battle of the Atlantic, World War II
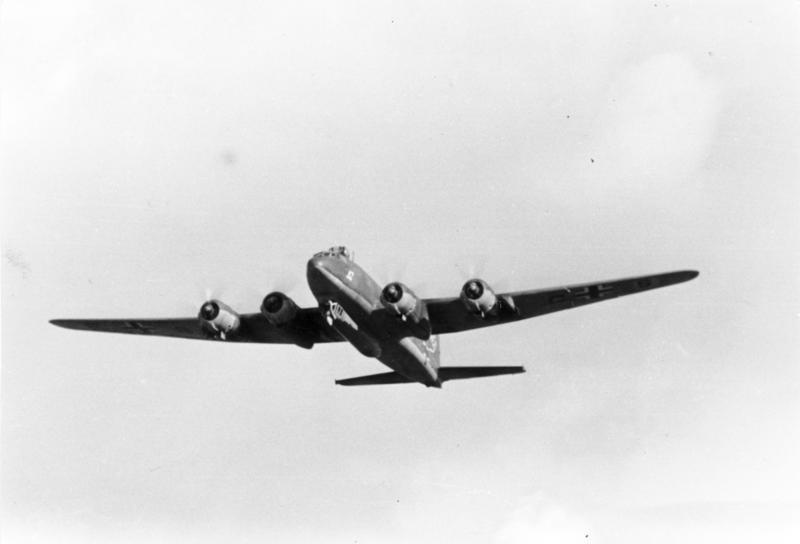
- A Fw 200 C-4 Condor in 1942. Aircraft of this model attacked Convoy Faith
| Date | 8–12 July 1943 |
| Location | Atlantic Ocean, about 480 km (260 nmi; 300 mi) west of Portugal |
| Result | German victory |

Belligerents
| Germany | United Kingdom; Canada; United States |

Commanders and leaders
| | (United Kingdom) W.G. Busk-Wood |

Strength
| First attack: three aircraft Second attack: two aircraft | Two troopships, one transport Two destroyers, two frigates, two flying boats |

Casualties and losses
| One wounded One aircraft damaged | 115 killed Two troopships sunk one storeship damaged |

Convoy Faith was a small, fast Allied convoy of World War II. It suffered heavy casualties when attacked by German long-range bombers while en route from Britain to West Africa in July 1943. The convoy comprised two large troopships and a freighter, later joined by two destroyers and two frigates as escorts at various dates after it sailed on 7 July 1943. The two troopships, SS California and SS Duchess of York, both former liners, were carrying military personnel to West Africa, where locally recruited troops were to be embarked as reinforcements for the Allied forces in Burma and the Middle East. The freighter MV Port Fairy, carrying ammunition, was ultimately bound for Australia and New Zealand via the Panama Canal.

On the evening of 11 July, four days after sailing, Convoy Faith was attacked by three Focke-Wulf Fw 200 Condors. Both troopships were severely damaged and over 100 of the personnel aboard the two ships were killed; they were subsequently sunk by torpedoes from the escorts. The freighter escaped unscathed, but was damaged in a second air attack on 12 July en route to Casablanca. The loss of the two troopships delayed the movement of a division of West African soldiers to India until four replacements arrived.

The British military was surprised by the attack on Convoy Faith, as it had been believed that the Condors no longer posed a serious threat. In response, the convoy route between Britain and Africa was moved to the west. The German Condor force attempted to repeat its success against Convoy Faith by carrying out similar attacks on other convoys, but sustained heavy losses from Allied anti-aircraft guns and aircraft.

== Background ==
From August 1940 to June 1941, the German Luftwaffe (air force) unit III./KG 40, which was based at Bordeaux–Mérignac Airport in southern France and equipped with Focke-Wulf Fw 200 Condors, attacked Allied shipping travelling in the Atlantic. The unit made a number of successful attacks on convoys and individual ships traveling in the Western Approaches as well as on the route between Britain and Gibraltar. In response, the Allies increased the anti-aircraft armament carried by many merchant ships, and began to deploy CAM ships and escort carriers to provide fighter protection for convoys. During the last six months of 1941 these improved defences inflicted heavy losses on the Condor force, and it ceased attacking shipping in early 1942. In 1942, III./KG 40 mainly operated in the reconnaissance role and reported targets for U-boats to attack. A small number of attacks were made on ships travelling between Britain and Gibraltar from May onwards, but these cost the unit eight Condors destroyed in action and seven in accidents for no sinkings. As a result of the Condor's vulnerability to Allied defences, the commander of the Luftwaffe's Atlantic anti-shipping force (Fliegerführer Atlantik) recommended in December that the aircraft be withdrawn from service.

The British military conducted regular convoys to transfer personnel from the United Kingdom to the Middle East and India from mid-1940 until late 1943. This convoy route was assigned the code "WS", which was widely believed to be an abbreviation for "Winston Special" in honor of Prime Minister Winston Churchill. The WS convoys typically comprised several large ocean liners which had been converted to troopships protected by a strong force of warships. As the Mediterranean Sea was a war zone, the convoys normally traveled from the Clyde in Scotland to the Middle East or South Asia via the Cape of Good Hope at the southern tip of Africa. En route, the ships typically stopped at Freetown in West Africa to refuel and embark water, and again at either Cape Town or Durban in South Africa. German aircraft, submarines and surface ships attacked the WS convoys on occasion.

== Prelude ==
Despite its poor performance during most of 1942, III./KG 40's ability to attack Allied shipping was improved late in the year. During the last months of 1942 the unit received 18 C-4 variants of the Fw 200 which were fitted with the Lotfe 7D bombsight. This sight reduced the Condors' vulnerability to anti-aircraft fire by allowing them to bomb targets from medium altitudes; previously they had only been able to attack accurately from low levels. Several of the unit's Condors were also fitted with surface search radar, which improved their ability to locate Allied ships. In early 1943 it was decided to use these aircraft to renew attacks on convoys travelling to Gibraltar in an attempt to disrupt the Allied buildup in the Mediterranean during the Tunisian campaign. These attacks began in early March and were conducted off Portugal between Lisbon and Cape St Vincent; this area was beyond the range of Allied fighter aircraft based in Gibraltar, and few escort carriers were available to protect convoys. III./KG 40 sank five merchant ships and damaged another two between March and the start of July, for the loss of at least five Condors. In response, the British began to use de Havilland Mosquito fighters to patrol the Bay of Biscay, deployed four additional squadrons of patrol aircraft to Gibraltar, and embarked signals intelligence teams on board warships in the Bay of Biscay to monitor KG 40's radio communications.

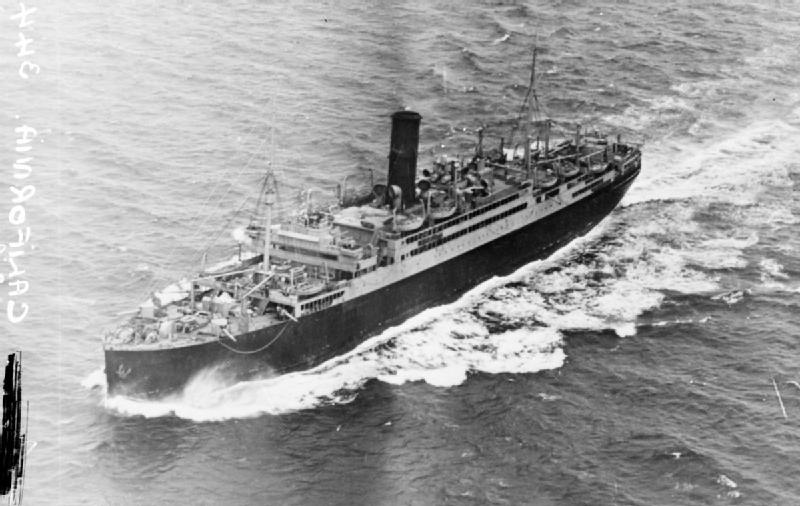
California during her service as an AMC during the first years of the war

In February 1943 the British Government decided to transfer the recently raised 81st (West Africa) Division from West Africa to India to take part in the Burma campaign. This unit required much more shipping space than other British divisions, as its fighting units were supported by thousands of porters. To facilitate the division's movement, additional troopships were assigned to the regular WS convoys. The 81st Division's advance parties departed Freetown with Convoys WS 29 and WS 30 in April and May, and the 6th (West Africa) Brigade embarked on ships of Convoy WS 31 at Lagos between 2 and 10 July. It was planned to transport the division's two remaining brigades in convoys WS 32 and WS 33.

The 5th (West Africa) Brigade was the second of the 81st Division's brigades to be shipped from West Africa. The brigade comprised 12,000 personnel and was scheduled to depart with Convoy WS 32 on 31 July. The liners Britannic, Largs Bay and Tamaroa were available in Freetown to carry 8,528 of these men, and it was decided to sail the troopship SS California directly from the Clyde to provide the remaining berths.

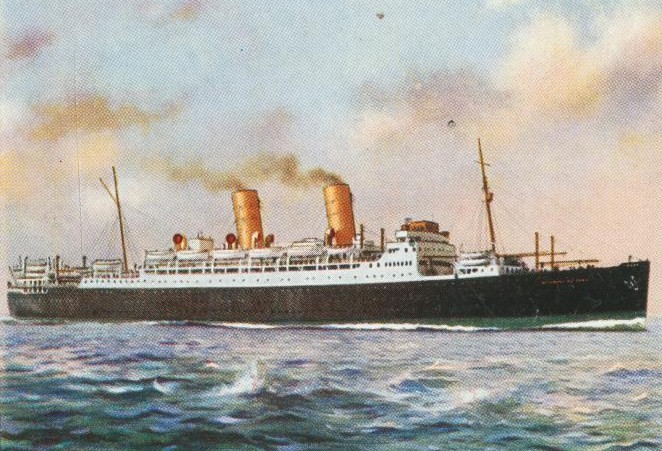
SS Duchess of York

California was a liner that had spent the first years of the war as an armed merchant cruiser before being converted to a troopship. She had previously carried troops to Bombay in India as part of convoys WS 22 and 26. She returned to the Clyde from Gibraltar on 4 June as part of Convoy MFK 15 and spent the next month docked in Glasgow undergoing repairs. Once this work was complete, California began to embark 470 personnel bound for West Africa on 4 July. She was to be accompanied on this voyage by SS Duchess of York, which had been tasked with carrying 600 Royal Air Force personnel and civilians to West Africa, but had missed an earlier convoy owing to electrical problems. Like California, Duchess of York was a pre-war liner which had been converted to a troopship. Prior to the ships' departure it was decided to use Duchess of York to transport elements of the 5th (West Africa) Brigade to Bombay after the ships arrived at Freetown, while California would instead carry other West African personnel to the Middle East.

== Attack ==
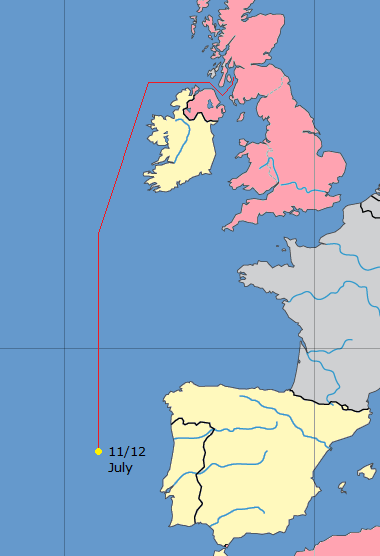
Convoy Faith's approximate route until the night of 11/12 July

California and Duchess of York sailed from Greenock on the afternoon of 7 July. They spent the night at anchor in the Clyde; shortly after getting underway early the next day they were joined by the storeship MV Port Fairy, bound for Australia and New Zealand via West Africa and the Panama Canal. The master of the Duchess of York, Captain W.G. Busk-Wood, probably served as the Convoy Commodore. Busk-Wood had been the master of the liner SS Duchess of Bedford prior to the war, and remained in command of this ship until November 1942 when he transferred to Duchess of York. He also held the rank of commander in the Royal Naval Reserve. The merchant ships were escorted by the destroyer HMS Douglas and frigate HMS Moyola from 9 July, and the Canadian destroyer HMCS Iroquois joined the convoy the next day. While Iroquois' commanding officer, Commander W.B.L Holms, was the most senior officer present, he chose to not assume command of the convoy as his destroyer would not remain with the troopships for their entire journey. The route taken by Convoy Faith was similar to that of other recent convoys sailing between Britain and Africa. While the strength of the escort force was much smaller than that assigned to the regular convoys, it was believed that submarines posed the main threat and that three warships would provide adequate protection.

Convoy Faith was detected by a German Condor at 8:00 pm on 11 July while about 480 kilometres (300 mi) off the Portuguese coast. This aircraft circled near the ships, broadcasting a homing signal. Two other Condors joined the first aircraft at about 9:00 pm, and they commenced their attack on the convoy shortly thereafter. At this time, Convoy Faith was deployed in a formation intended to protect the ships from submarines. The two troopships and Port Fairy were sailing line abreast (Duchess of York was the westernmost of the three ships, California was in the centre and Port Fairy at the east of this group), Iroquois was located 3,000 yards (2,700 m) ahead and the two other escorts were on each flank of the troopships. Busk-Wood had maintained this formation after the first Condor was spotted in the belief that the aircraft would call in submarines rather than conduct an attack.

The three Condors made their attack from an altitude of about 15,000 feet (4,600 m). Despite heavy anti-aircraft fire from the escorts, California was badly damaged by a near miss from the first plane to attack, and was hit by two bombs dropped by the second attacker. The damage caused by these bombs flooded one of the ship's holds and set her on fire. California's passengers were evacuated on board lifeboats while the crew tried to save the ship. This proved unsuccessful, however, and they abandoned ship later that night. Duchess of York also came under attack; several bombs hit the centre of the ship and set her on fire. This fire could not be brought under control, and she too was abandoned, at 10:40 pm on 11 July. Port Fairy was also straddled by two near misses, but did not suffer significant damage. Both troopships were subsequently torpedoed and sunk by their escorts, Duchess of York by Douglas, for fear their blazing hulks would attract German submarines to the area.

While there are differing accounts of the casualties on board the two troopships, the official figures state that 89 people were killed on board Duchess of York and 26 on board California. The survivors were rescued by the two destroyers and Moyola, including 660 by Iroquois alone. They were subsequently taken to Casablanca in North Africa by the warships, from where the seamen returned to Britain and military personnel continued to West Africa on board the troopship SS Nea Hellas.

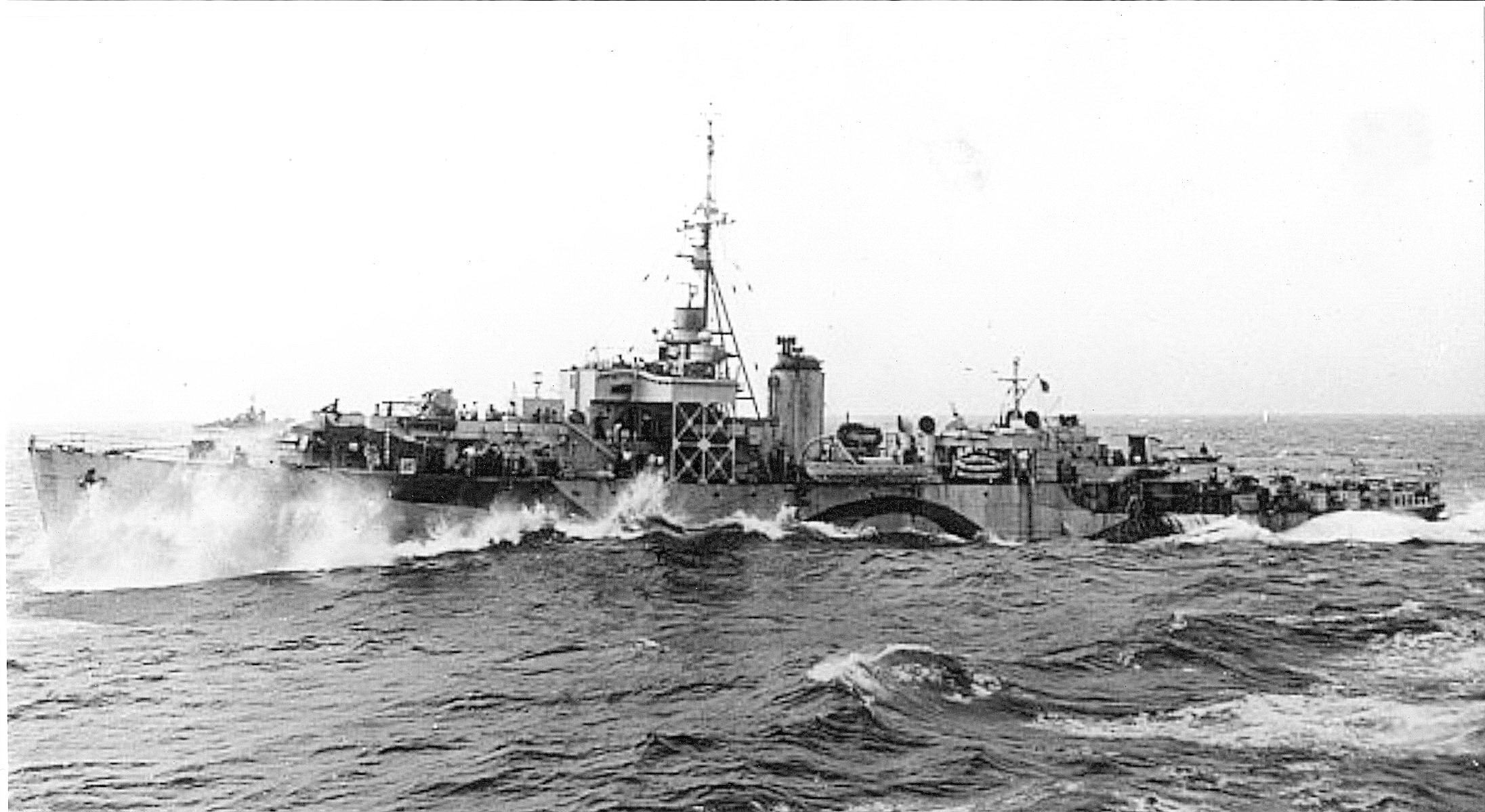
HMS Swale

The frigate HMS Swale, despatched from Gibraltar to make rendezvous, sighted the convoy under attack at 10:10 pm, and was herself attacked by Condors, the bombs falling 20 yards (18 m) astern. After conducting an A/S sweep around the convoy, Swale was ordered to detach and escort Port Fairy to Casablanca. At 6:45 pm the following day, Swale rescued eight survivors from a PBY Catalina, but within an hour the two ships were again attacked by Condors returning from a reconnaissance mission. Despite the intervention of two United States Navy Catalinas sent to their aid, a bomb hit Port Fairy on her starboard quarter, starting a fire next to the magazine and disabling her steering. The Catalinas eventually drove off the Condors with machine gun fire; one of the German aircrew was seriously wounded in this engagement. At 10:05 pm Swale came alongside Port Fairy to aid the extinction of the fire with her hoses. With Port Fairy in danger of exploding, 64 survivors from the two troopships and 8 passengers were transferred to Swale. The blaze was eventually extinguished at 00:41 am, and both ships continued the remaining 500 nautical miles (930 km) to Casablanca without further incident, Port Fairy steering by her engines. Port Fairy did not suffer any casualties in the attack and was repaired on arrival at Casablanca.

== Aftermath ==
The losses suffered by Convoy Faith shocked the British military, as it had been believed that the Condor force no longer posed a significant threat. The decision to use a route which was similar to that used by previous convoys despite Convoy Faith's small escort made it an attractive target. In his assessment of the action Admiral Charles Forbes, the Commander-in-Chief, Plymouth strongly criticised the troopships for not taking evasive action during the attack. He also criticised the captain of Iroquois for not assuming command of the convoy. However, the Canadian official history argues that "it is doubtful whether Holms would have acted differently under the circumstances". In order to prevent a repetition of the attack, the convoy routes between Britain and West Africa were moved further to the west so that they were almost at the limit of the Condors' range.

The loss of California and Duchess of York represented a heavy blow to the Allies' already heavily committed fleet of large troopships. Duchess of York's intended role was filled by Nea Hellas after she disembarked Convoy Faith's survivors at Freetown. Nea Hellas embarked the Gold Coast elements of the 5th (West Africa) Brigade at Takoradi from 2 August while Britannic, Tamaroa and Largs Bay loaded the remainder of the unit at other West African ports. Convoy WS 32 sailed from Freetown on 5 August, and Nea Hellas joined it at sea two days later. The liner was left behind at Durban owing to a mechanical fault, but eventually disembarked its soldiers at Bombay in late September after sailing there as part of Convoy CM 45. The West African personnel which were to be transported to the Middle East on board California were embarked on Convoy WS 33 in September and arrived at their destination in early November.

The Germans attempted to build on their success against Convoy Faith by carrying out further medium-altitude attacks on convoys. III./KG 40 sank another four ships between July and September 1943, but suffered heavy losses from Allied aircraft and anti-aircraft guns. From October, Heinkel He 177s largely took over the Condors' anti-shipping role, and the last Condor sorties were made over the Atlantic in early 1944.

== Bibliography ==
- Coombs, Howard (2008). The Insubordinate and the Noncompliant: Case Studies of Canadian Mutiny and Disobedience, 1920 to Present. Toronto: Dundurn Press. ISBN 978-1-55002-764-8.
- Douglas, W.A.B.; et al. (2007). A Blue Water Navy : The Official Operational History of the Royal Canadian Navy in the Second World War, 1943–1945. Volume II, Part 2. St. Catherine's, Canada: Vanwell Publlishing. ISBN 978-1-55125-069-4.
- Forczyk, Robert (2010). Fw 200 Condor vs Atlantic Convoy. 1943–43. Oxford: Osprey Publishing. ISBN 978-1-84603-917-1.
- Hague, Arnold (2000). The Allied Convoy System 1939–1945 : Its Organization, Defence and Operation. St. Catharines, Canada: Vanwell Publishing. ISBN 1-55125-033-0.
- Munro, Archie (2006). The Winston Specials: Troopships Via the Cape 1940–1943. Liskeard, United Kingdom: Maritime Books. ISBN 978-1-904459-20-0.
- Ragnarsson, R. (2006). US Navy PBY Catalina Units of the Atlantic War. Oxford: Osprey Publishing. ISBN 1-84176-910-X.
