= MV Port Fairy =

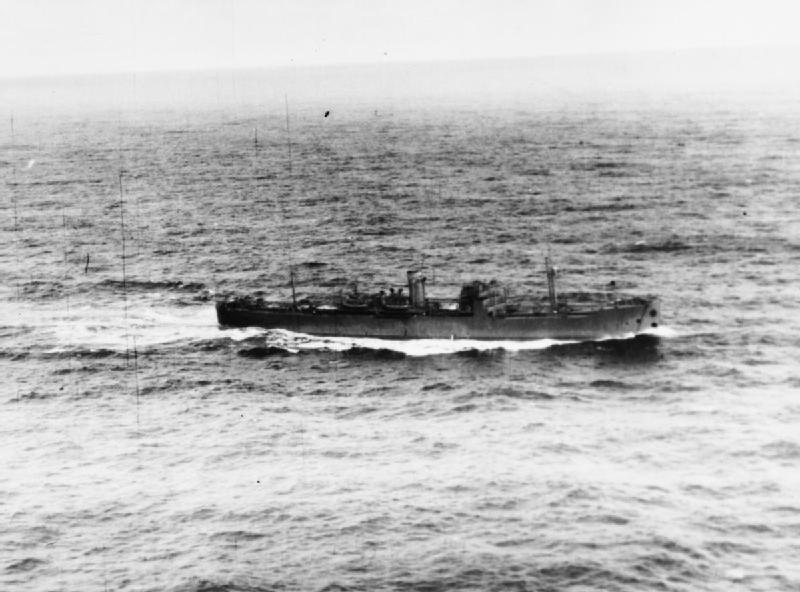

History

United Kingdom
- Name: MV Port Fairy
- Namesake: Port Fairy, Victoria
- Owner: Commonwealth and Dominion Line
- Builder: Swan Hunter, Tyne and Wear
- Yard number: 1339
- Launched: 18 July 1928
- Completed: October 1928
- Fate: Sold to Embajada Cia. Naviera SA of Piraeus

Greece
- Name: MV Taishikan
- Owner: Embajada Compania Naviera SA of Piraeus
- Acquired: 1965
- Identification: Official number: 5528236
- Fate: Broken up at Hong Kong on 4 June 1965

General characteristics
- Tonnage: 8072 GRT
- Length: 477.4 ft (145.5 m)
- Beam: 63.4 ft (19.3 m)
- Propulsion: Diesel engines; Twin screws
- Speed: 15 knots (28 km/h)

MV Port Fairy was a UK merchant vessel built in 1928 by Swan Hunter for the Commonwealth & Dominion Line Ltd (or "Port Line") shipping company and sold in 1965 to Embajada Compania Naviera SA of Piraeus. Named after the coastal town of Port Fairy in Australia, she was renamed Taishikan for her final commercial voyage to Hong Kong where she was scrapped.

== Career ==
=== Construction ===
Port Fairy, 8072 GRT, was built by Swan, Hunter & Wigham Richardson at Wallsend in 1928. She had a length of 147 m (482 ft 3 in), a beam of 19.3 m (63 ft 4 in) and a service speed of 15 knots.

=== Pre-War ===
In 1930 her refrigeration equipment was modified and she carried the first cargo of chilled meat (instead of frozen meat) from Australia; she later worked the same cargo from New Zealand.

=== World War II ===
Port Fairy had an eventful war employed as an ammunition ship.

Sailing in fast convoy OL8 from Liverpool to Canada, on the night of 22 October 1940 Port Fairy collided with the Canadian destroyer Margaree (formerly HMS Diana) in rough seas about 300 miles (483 km) west of Ireland (position 53°24′N 22°50′W.). Margaree, broken in two, sank quickly; her captain, four officers and 136 crew were lost; Port Fairy rescued all 34 survivors.

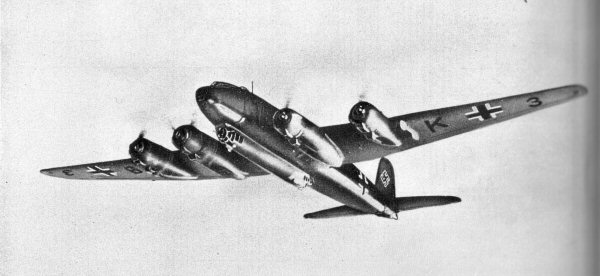
Focke Wulf Fw 200

On 9 July 1943 the small Convoy Faith, comprising Port Fairy, the troopships Duchess of York and California, with escorts Iroquois, Douglas and Moyola, sailed Greenock for Freetown, Sierra Leone. Two days later, when the convoy was about 300 miles west of Vigo, it was attacked by 3 Focke-Wulf Fw 200 aircraft of Kampfgeschwader 40 based at Merignac, near Bordeaux. The precision high-altitude bombing left both Duchess of York and California blazing. Port Fairy picked up 64 RAF survivors from Duchess of York. Both Duchess of York and California were abandoned, and in the early hours of 12 July they were sunk by torpedoes from their escorts as it was feared the flames from the ships would attract U-boats.

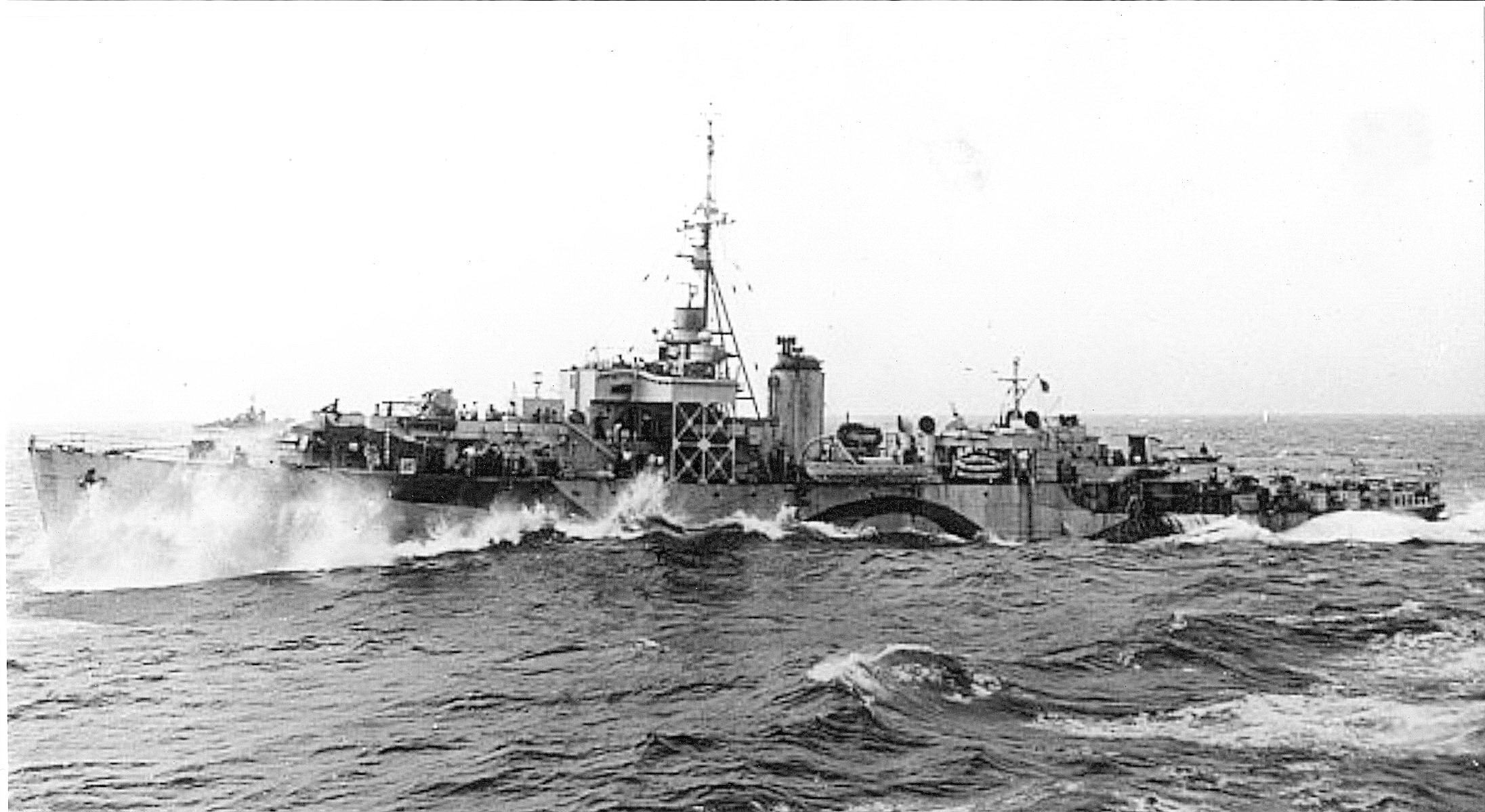
HMS Swale

Towards the end of the attack, the remnants of the convoy were joined by the British frigate Swale which had sailed Gibraltar two days earlier for a scheduled rendezvous. Port Fairy was detached to Casablanca with Swale as escort shortly after midnight, for fear of further attacks. Nevertheless, the two ships were attacked the following evening by two Fw 200s returning from a reconnaissance mission. Despite the interception of the two bombers by two US Navy PBY Catalinas which strafed and badly damaged one of them Port Fairy was hit on the port quarter by a 50 kg bomb which breached the hull, started a fire, and disabled her steering. Ammunition in adjacent cargo spaces was jettisoned and compartments flooded to minimize the risk of explosion. A bucket chain was set up to douse the fire, meanwhile Swale came alongside and played her own hoses on the blaze, which was extinguished by 2300 hrs. After two more air attacks, during which no further hits were sustained, both ships completed the remaining 500 nm to Casablanca without incident, Port Fairy steering by her engines.

=== Post-War ===
On 25 December 1953, while operating on the Montreal - Australian New Zealand service, both engines failed owing to contaminated lubrication oil and the ship drifted for three days towards the rocks of Fatu Hira atoll. Plans were put in place to rig a temporary sail, but as this was being done one of the engines was repaired and the ship made port at 5 knots.

=== Disposal ===
By 1965 Port Fairy was the oldest ship in the fleet, and was sold for £126,000 for scrap to Embajada Compania Naviera SA of Piraeus. Renamed Taishikan, she made her final commercial voyage to Hong Kong, where she was broken up.
