= HMS Douglas =

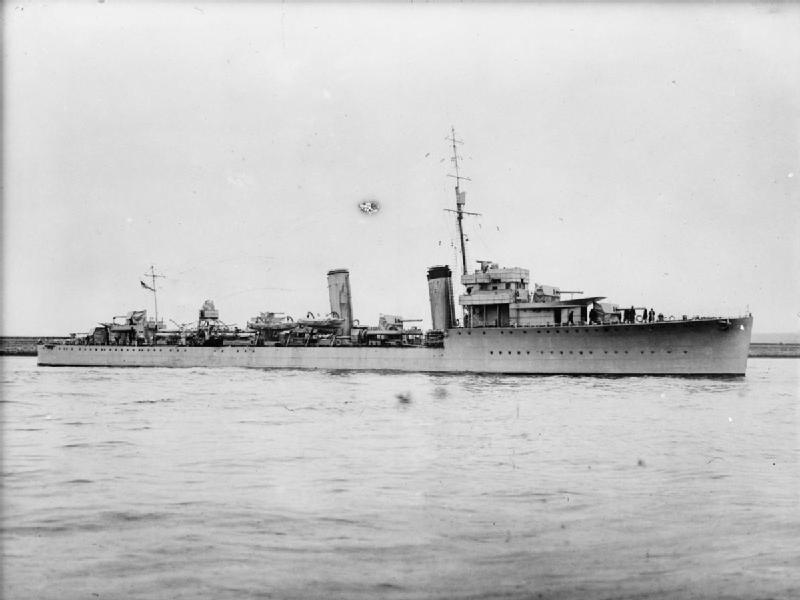

History

United Kingdom
- Name: HMS Douglas
- Ordered: July 1916
- Builder: Cammell Laird
- Laid down: 30 June 1917
- Launched: 20 February 1918
- Commissioned: 2 September 1918
- Out of service: Paid off into reserve, February 1945
- Fate: Sold for scrap on 20 March 1945

General characteristics
- Class & type: Admiralty type destroyer leader
- Displacement: 1,580 long tons (1,610 t) Normal; 2,050 long tons (2,080 t) deep load
- Length: 332 ft 6 in (101.35 m)
- Beam: 31 ft 9 in (9.68 m)
- Draught: 12 ft 6 in (3.81 m)
- Installed power: 40,000 shp (30,000 kW)
- Propulsion: 2 × steam engines; 2 × shafts
- Speed: 36.5 kn (42.0 mph; 67.6 km/h)
- Range: 5,000 nmi (5,800 mi; 9,300 km) at 15 kn (17 mph; 28 km/h)
- Complement: 164-183
- Armament: 5 × BL 4.7-inch (120 mm) Mk I guns; 6 × 21-inch (533 mm) torpedo tubes

HMS Douglas was an Admiralty type flotilla leader (also known as the Scott-class) of the British Royal Navy. Built by Cammell Laird, Douglas commissioned in 1918, just before the end of the First World War. During the Second World War, Douglas served with Force H out of Gibraltar and as a convoy escort. She was sold for scrap in March 1945.

== Design and construction ==
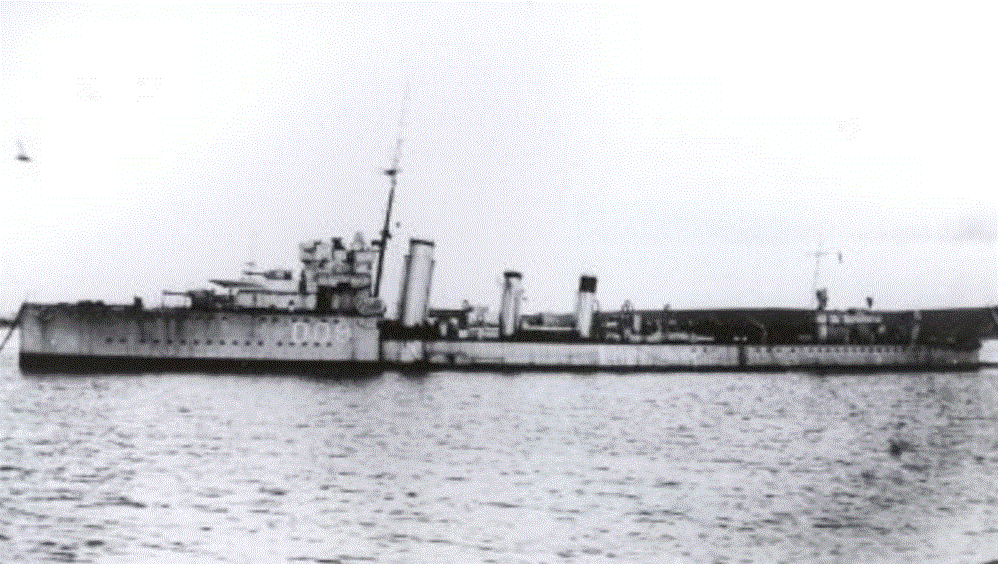
HMS Douglas (1918) before modifications

In December 1916, the British Admiralty placed orders for two large flotilla leaders, HMS Bruce and Douglas from Cammell Laird as a follow on to the prototype of the class, HMS Scott, which had been ordered in April that year. The ship was 320 feet 0 inches (97.54 m) long between perpendiculars and 332 feet 5 inches (101.32 m) overall, with a beam of 31 feet 9 inches (9.68 m) and a draught of 12 feet 6 inches (3.81 m). Design displacement was 1,580 long tons (1,610 t) normal and 2,050 long tons (2,080 t) full load. The ship's machinery consisted of four Yarrow boilers that fed steam at 250 pounds per square inch (1,700 kPa) to two sets of Parsons single-reduction geared-steam turbines, rated at 40,000 shaft horsepower (30,000 kW). This gave a design speed of 36.5 knots (67.6 km/h; 42.0 mph) light, which corresponded to about 32 knots (59 km/h; 37 mph) at full load.

Douglas' main gun armament consisted of five 4.7 in (120 mm)/45 calibre BL Mark I guns, (Note: In British practice, BL (Breech Loading) indicated that a separate, bagged charge was used.) on CP VI mountings capable of elevating to 30 degrees. These guns could fire a 50-pound (23 kg) shell to 15,800 yards (14,400 m) at a rate of 5–6 rounds per minute per gun. 120 rounds per gun were carried. Anti-aircraft armament consisted of a single 3 inch (76 mm) 20 cwt gun. Torpedo armament consisted of six 21 inch (533 mm) torpedo tubes in two triple mounts.

Douglas was laid down at Cammell Laird's Birkenhead shipyard on 30 June 1917, launched on 8 June 1918 and commissioned on 30 August 1918. (Note: Friedman states that Douglas was launched on 20 February 1918 and completed on 2 September 1918.)

=== Modifications ===
While Douglas had only limited modifications between the wars, an early change during the Second World War was the replacement of the amidships 4.7-inch gun by two 2-pounder (40 mm) "pom-pom" autocannon, with the aft funnel shortened to improve the field of fire for the 3 inch anti-aircraft gun. Three Oerlikon 20 mm cannon later supplemented the short-range anti-aircraft armament, while a further two Oerlikons finally replaced the 2-pounders. Radar (Type 286, later replaced by Type 290 and Type 271) was fitted during the war, as was HF/DF radio direction-finding gear.

Conversion to a short-range escort involved removal of two more 4.7 inch guns and a bank of torpedo tubes, with the forward gun replaced by a Hedgehog anti-submarine mortar, and the aft gun and tubes removed to allow a heavy depth charge armament of 70 charges.

== Service history ==
On commissioning Douglas joined the 6th Destroyer Flotilla, part of the Dover Patrol, as leader. On 16 September 1918, Douglas' boats helped to pick up survivors from the monitor Glatton, which was scuttled in Dover harbour following a magazine fire and explosion. In October, Douglas was employed escorting monitors off the Belgian coast, taking part in the bombardment of Ostend on 17 October 1918 and rescuing survivors from M21 when the monitor was mined and sunk off Ostend on 20 October. On 25 October that year Douglas transferred to the Grand Fleet, joining the 11th Destroyer Flotilla at Scapa Flow.

By March 1919, Douglas had moved to the 7th Destroyer Flotilla, but by May 1919, Douglas was in reserve at Rosyth. On 18 March 1920, Douglas recommissioned as leader for the 4th Destroyer Flotilla of the Atlantic Fleet. On 2 December, she was damaged by a collision at Queenstown in the south of Ireland, and was under repair at Pembroke Dock until 26 January 1921. Douglas reduced to reserve (with a reduced complement) on 26 June 1921, and was still laid up at Rosyth at the end of 1921. In March 1922, Douglas, still under reserve, moved to Devonport, and from June to November that year was employed testing cradles for new slipways at Pembroke, before returning to reserve at Devonport.

Douglas was refitted at Sheerness dockyard in January to March 1928, and then commissioned as leader of the 1st Submarine Flotilla of the Mediterranean Fleet, based at Malta on 7 April 1928. Douglas was again refitted at Sheerness from October 1933 to May 1934, where her boilers were retubed, before returning to the 1st Submarine Flotilla. Douglas was refitted at Malta in August 1935, and in September that year, as a result of the Abyssinia Crisis, reinforcing the 1st Destroyer Flotilla. In July 1936, following the outbreak of the Spanish Civil War, the Royal Navy sent ships to Spanish harbours to evacuate British subjects, with Douglas being one of several ships sent to Barcelona. Douglas returned to the 1st Destroyer Flotilla in September 1936, and remained part of that flotilla in March 1939. Douglas was refitted at Gibraltar from March to July 1939.

=== Second World War ===
In September 1939, at the start of the Second World War, Douglas was a member of the 13th Destroyer Flotilla, based at Gibraltar, having joined the flotilla on 22 August. On 24 October, Douglas, along with the leader Keppel and the destroyers Watchman and Vidette, set out to hunt the German submarine U-37, which had sunk three merchant ships. Douglas picked up the survivors from one of the ships, the Tafna. A Saro London flying boat of No. 202 Squadron RAF from Gibraltar, landed to rescue survivors, but was unable to take-off again and was towed back to Gibraltar by Douglas as she returned the survivors to land. On 21 January 1940, Douglas was escorting the Gibraltar bound Convoy OG 15F off the coast of Portugal when she spotted U-44 and attacked. U-44 sustained only minor damage.

On 8 July 1940, Douglas sortied as part of the escort for Force H, which had left Gibraltar to act as a distraction while the British Mediterranean Fleet escorted two convoys between Malta and Alexandria. While the Mediterranean Fleet clashed briefly with Italian forces at the Battle of Calabria, Force H caused Italian submarines, one of which sank the destroyer Escort, to be deployed away from the convoy and attracted many air attacks. Later that month, Douglas returned to Britain, undergoing condenser repairs before joining to the Home Fleet, based at Scapa Flow, patrolling, escorting the fleet and minelaying operations. On 2 November, Douglas rescued twelve survivors from the naval trawler Wardour, that had sunk on a mine on 31 October.

In February 1941, Douglas was transferred from the Home Fleet to Western Approaches Command, joining the 2nd Escort Group. On 28 April, Convoy HX 121 came under U-boat attack, and the 2nd Escort Group, including Douglas, was detached from Convoy OB 314 to reinforce Convoy HX 121. On approaching the convoy, Douglas rescued 18 survivors from the tanker Capulet, which had been torpedoed by U-552, but failed to sink the hulk of Capulet with gunfire. (Note: The remnants of Capulet was sunk by U-201 on 2 May.) Douglas depth-charged and sank the submarine U-65. (Note: The sinking of U-65 was originally attributed to the corvette Gladiolus in an attack on 29 April, but credit for the sinking was reassigned to Douglas following postwar research.) In all four ships were lost from HX 121, with one U-boat being sunk. On 11 September, the 2nd Escort Group, led by Commander W. E. Banks aboard Douglas, left Convoy ON 13F to reinforce Convoy SC 42 under attack off the east coast of Greenland from the U-boats of the wolfpack Markgraf, which had sunk 15 ships from the convoy already. Banks took charge of the defence, ordering the destroyers Leamington and Veteran to investigate a sighting by an aircraft of a submarine ahead of the convoy, which resulted in the two destroyers sinking U-207, and managing to see off several U-boats over the next few days.

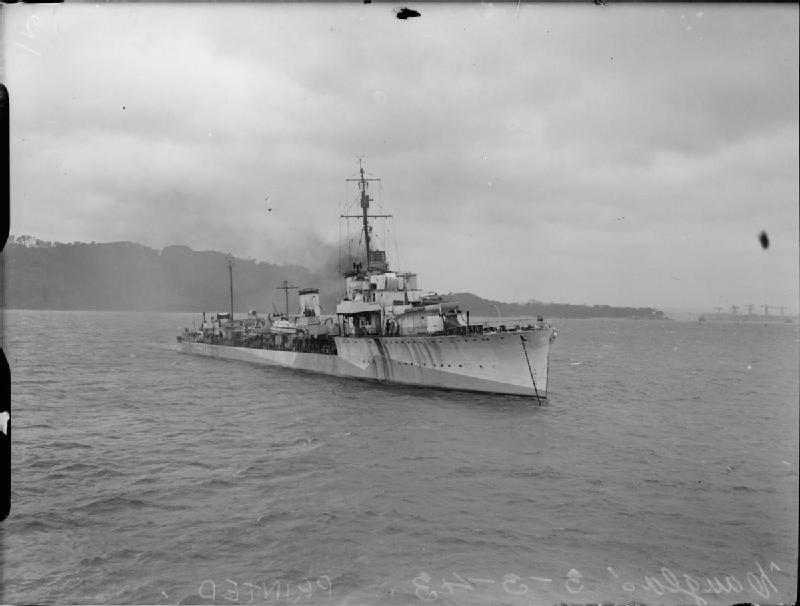
Douglas after conversion to a short range escort

On 15 January 1942, Douglas was part of the escort of Convoy ON 55 off Iceland in a severe storm (described as the worst seen in Iceland for 15 years) when the American destroyer Mayo, part of an American escort group attempting to relieve the 2nd Escort Group, collided with Douglas, badly damaging both ships, with one seaman lost from Douglas. After temporary repairs by the depot ship Hecla at Iceland and returning to Britain, it was decided to convert Douglas to a short-range escort while she was under repair at Palmers in Jarrow. This involved reducing the ship's gun and torpedo armament to accommodate better anti-submarine weaponry.

Douglas was under repair and refit until April 1942, joining the Home Fleet in May. Douglas formed part of the ill-fated Arctic Convoy Convoy PQ 17, but left the convoy to join Convoy QP 13, which was returning from the Soviet Union at the same time as Convoy PQ 17 was sailing to the Soviet Union, on 2 July 1942, before Convoy PQ 17 had come under serious attack. The ship continued in escort operations, and in November 1942, rescued 29 survivors from the merchant ship Louise Moller, sunk by U-172 on 13 November south-east of Durban. On 11 July 1943, Douglas, together with the destroyer HMCS Iroquois and the frigate Moyola, were escorting a convoy consisting of the troopships California and Duchess of York and the munitions ship Port Fairy, when the convoy was attacked by three Focke-Wulf Fw 200 Condors of Kampfgeschwader 40 300 nmi (560 km; 350 mi) off Vigo. California and Duchess of York were badly hit, with 46 killed aboard California and 27 aboard Duchess of York; the burning ships were sunk by the escorts early the next day after the survivors were rescued, to avoid the attentions of U-boats. (Note: states that Duchess of York was scuttled by Douglas's torpedoes, while states that the wrecks of both troopships were sunk by Douglas.)

On 31 October 1943, the naval trawler Imperialist depth-charged the German submarine U-732 west of Gibraltar, forcing the submarine to the surface and scored several gun hits before U-732 managed to submerge, which resulted in Imperialist subjecting U-732 to another depth-charging. After dark, U-732 attempted to escape on the surface but was spotted by an aircraft, the captain of U-732 ordered that the submarine be scuttled, but before it sank, Douglas attacked with 10 more depth charges. Eighteen of U-732's crew were rescued, eight by Douglas, with 31 killed. Imperialist and Douglas were jointly credited with the sinking of U-732. Douglas continued in use as a convoy escort until February 1945 when she was paid off into reserve. She was sold for scrap on 20 March 1945 to the British Iron & Steel Corporation (BISCO) who passed the ship on to TW Ward.
