= In Her Place =

In Her Place may refer to:

- In Her Place (2014 film), a Canadian-South Korean film
- In Her Place (2024 film), a Chilean historical crime drama film
