= The Fuse: Or How I Burned Simon Bolivar =

Canadian documentary by Igor Drljaca

- Directed by: Igor Drljaca
- Written by: Igor Drljaca
- Produced by: Igor Drljaca
- Edited by: Igor Drljaca
- Production company: Timelapse Pictures
- Release date: September 11, 2011 (TIFF)
- Running time: 9 minutes
- Country: Canada
- Languages: Bosnian; Serbo-Croatian

The Fuse: Or How I Burned Simon Bolivar (Kako sam Zapalio Simona Bolivara) is a 2011 Canadian documentary short film directed by Igor Drljaca. The film recounts Drljaca's childhood belief that he was personally responsible for the outbreak of the Bosnian Civil War because he tried to avoid a poor grade on a school assignment. He revisits family VHS tapes to recount how his childhood collides with forces he couldn't possibly comprehend. In doing so, he transforms this deeply personal story of trauma into a much more universal reflection on lost innocence, and how being a child can be accompanied by simultaneous, paradoxical feelings of both boundless power and crushing powerlessness.

The film premiered at the 2011 Toronto International Film Festival, and was named to the festival's annual year-end Canada's Top Ten list. It had its international premiere at South by Southwest in 2012. It was a nominee for Best Short Documentary at the 1st Canadian Screen Awards.
