= Toronto Film Critics Association Awards 2014 =

Annual Canadian film awards ceremony

18th Toronto Film Critics Association Awards
- Date: December 15, 2014

The 18th Toronto Film Critics Association Awards, honoring the best in film for 2014, were awarded on December 15, 2014.

== Winners ==
Category	Winners and nominees	Films
Best Film	Richard Linklater	Boyhood
Best Film	Wes Anderson	The Grand Budapest Hotel
Best Film	Paul Thomas Anderson	Inherent Vice
Best Canadian Film	Denis Villeneuve	Enemy
Best Canadian Film	Xavier Dolan	Mommy
Best Canadian Film	Michael Dowse	The F Word
Best Actor	Tom Hardy	Locke
Best Actor	Ralph Fiennes	The Grand Budapest Hotel
Best Actor	Jake Gyllenhaal	Nightcrawler
Best Actress	Marion Cotillard	The Immigrant
Best Actress	Julianne Moore	Still Alice
Best Actress	Reese Witherspoon	Wild
Best Supporting Actor	J. K. Simmons	Whiplash
Best Supporting Actor	Josh Brolin	Inherent Vice
Best Supporting Actor	Edward Norton	Birdman
Best Supporting Actress	Patricia Arquette	Boyhood
Best Supporting Actress	Tilda Swinton	Snowpiercer
Best Supporting Actress	Katherine Waterston	Inherent Vice
Best Director	Richard Linklater	Boyhood
Best Director	Wes Anderson	The Grand Budapest Hotel
Best Director	Paul Thomas Anderson	Inherent Vice
Best Screenplay	Wes Anderson	The Grand Budapest Hotel
Best Screenplay	Richard Linklater	Boyhood
Best Screenplay	Paul Thomas Anderson	Inherent Vice
Best First Feature	Ritesh Batra	The Lunchbox
Best First Feature	Chad Stahelski	John Wick
Best First Feature	Dan Gilroy	Nightcrawler
Best Animated Feature	Isao Takahata	The Tale of the Princess Kaguya
Best Animated Feature	Don Hall and Chris Williams	Big Hero 6
Best Animated Feature	Dean DeBlois	How to Train Your Dragon 2
Best Animated Feature	Phil Lord and Christopher Miller	The Lego Movie
Best Foreign-Language Film	Ruben Östlund	Force Majeure
Best Foreign-Language Film	Paweł Pawlikowski	Ida
Best Foreign-Language Film	Andrey Zvyagintsev	Leviathan
Best Documentary Film	Jesse Moss	The Overnighters
Best Documentary Film	Laura Poitras	Citizenfour
Best Documentary Film	Stephanie Spray and Pacho Velez	Manakamana
Scotiabank Jay Scott Prize for an emerging artist	Albert Shin	In Her Place
