= The Stone Speakers =

- Film poster
- Directed by: Igor Drljaca
- Written by: Igor Drljaca
- Produced by: Igor Drljaca; Albert Shin
- Cinematography: Amel Djikoli
- Edited by: Igor Drljaca
- Production company: Timelapse Pictures
- Distributed by: Game Theory Films
- Release date: September 8, 2018 (TIFF)
- Running time: 92 minutes
- Countries: Canada, Bosnia and Herzegovina
- Languages: Bosnian; Croatian; English; Serbian

The Stone Speakers is a 2018 Canadian documentary, directed by Igor Drljaca. The film examines the growth of ideological tourism in post-war Bosnia and Herzegovina.

It premiered in the Wavelengths section of the 2018 Toronto International Film Festival, had its international premiere at the 69th Berlin International Film Festival, and was acquired for Canadian distribution by Game Theory Films. NOW Magazine's Kevin Ritchie called it "a timely film given recent debates around public monuments and who we decide to memorialize and why."
