= Battle of Audierne Bay =

1944 battle of World War II

- Part of the Battle of the Atlantic and the Invasion of Normandy
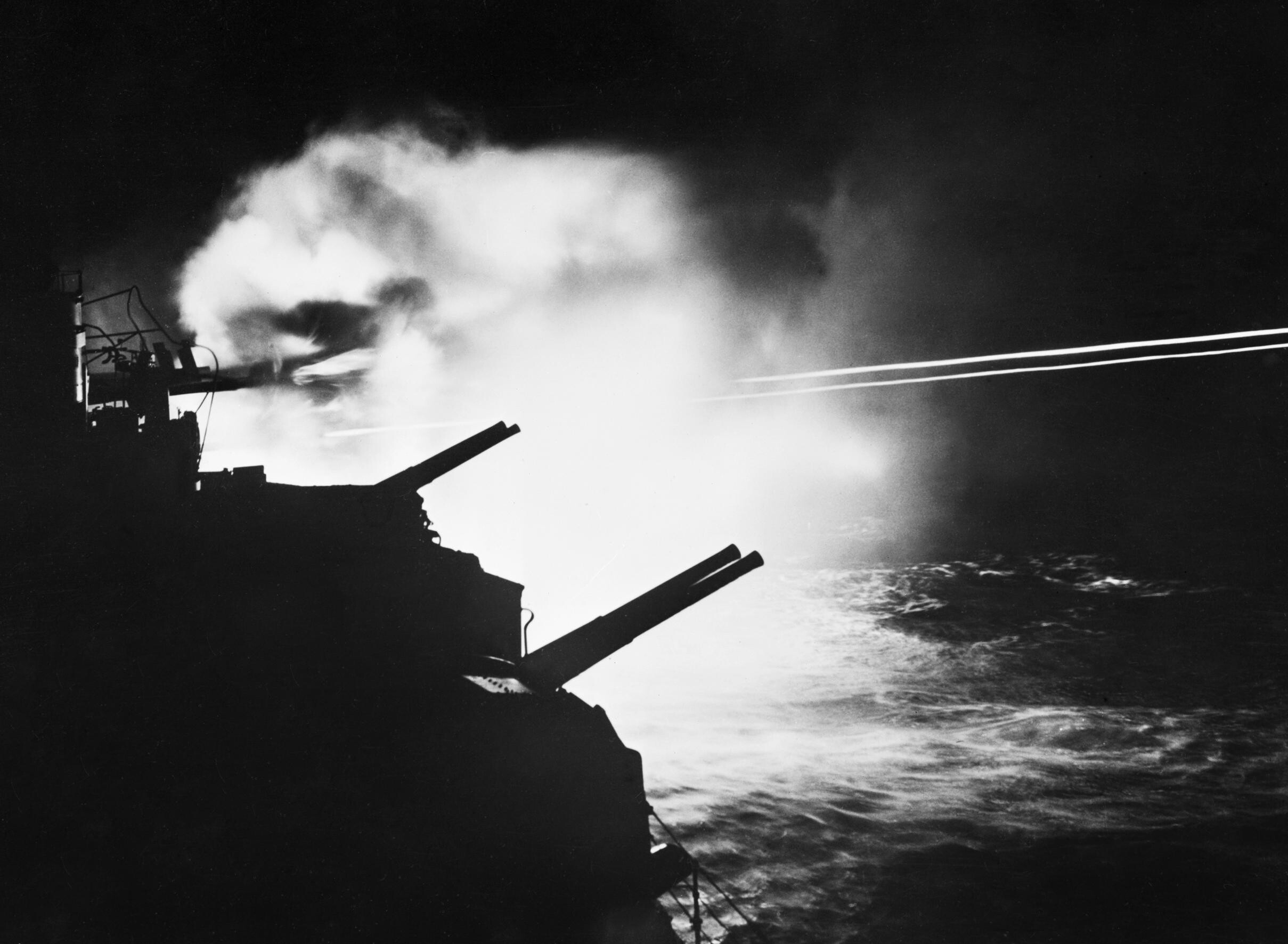
- 6-inch guns of HMS Mauritius firing during the action in Audierne Bay 23 August 1944
Date	23 August 1944
Location	Bay of Audierne between Brest and Lorient, France 47.91°N 4.48°W
Result	Allied victory

Belligerents
United Kingdom; Canada	(Nazi Germany) Germany

Commanders and leaders
(United Kingdom) William Davis	(Nazi Germany) Unknown

Strength
Cruiser Mauritius; Destroyer Ursa; Destroyer Iroquois	10 armed ships

Casualties and losses
None	8 ships sunk 161 captured

The Battle of the Audierne Bay was an engagement between German and Allied naval flotillas that took place on 23 August 1944, during World War II. Three Allied warships, which had already established control off the coast of Brittany and were lurking off Audierne south of the invested fortress of Brest, intercepted and sank eight German vessels of an armed convoy. This was the conclusion of Operation Kinetic; an allied plan to intercept shipping and hinder Germans besieged at Brest.

== Background ==
By 11 August, the Mortain counter-offensive had ground to a halt. To the east, US forces took Argentan on 13 August while British and Canadian forces closed in toward Falaise from the north, thus initiating the drive to encircle and destroy two German armies inside the Falaise Pocket. As the siege of the Breton ports continued, the focus of the war was quickly shifting further east.

Operation Kinetic had been set up by the Royal Navy Command Headquarters; the objective of which was to eliminate the German navy all along the French Atlantic ports. Of three Forces of Kinetic - Force 27 under the command of William Davis, consisting of the light cruiser HMS Mauritius and the destroyers HMS Ursa and HMCS Iroquois, departed Plymouth on 13 August to carry out a new patrol along the central section of the Biscay coast. With the Germans under the command of Marinegruppenkommando West on the move to evacuate by sea, the ongoing Kinetic had already scored two successes and was finalizing for the naval offensive in the Bay of Biscay to complete the success.

On the night of 22/23 August, under orders from naval intelligence the cruiser HMS Mauritius and the destroyers HMCS Iroquois and HMS Ursa were patrolling Audierne Bay between Brest and Lorient and radar soon picked up a large contact heading towards them.

== Battles ==
Davis ordered Iroquois; the ship closest to the contact, commanded by James Calcutt Hibbard to use the Type 293 radar and relay the information to the rest of the force. Hibbard placed so much confidence in the radar that he decided to direct the opening moves from the Action Information Centre rather than the bridge, and then gave the order to illuminate with star shell. As a result, Force 27 was able to close undetected and launched a surprise attack on the known convoy which were three ships.

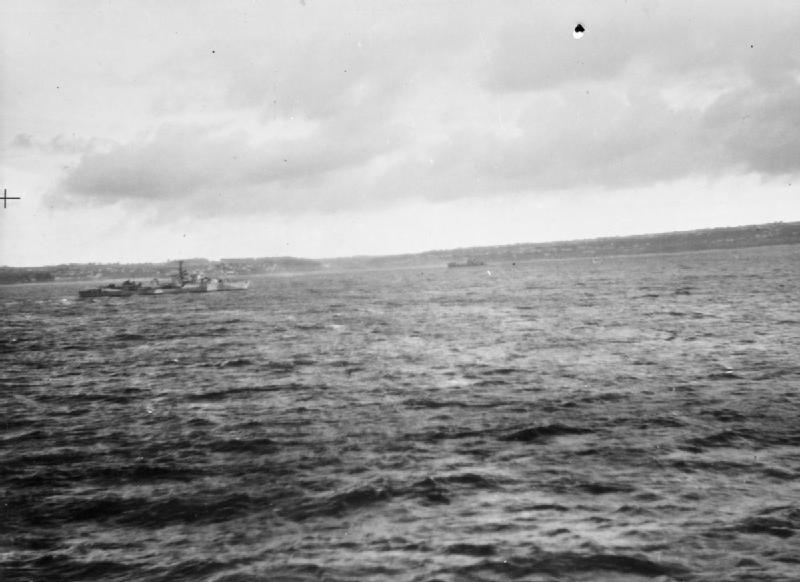
HMCS Iroquois going in to torpedo one of the German ships driven aground

At 0213 Iroquois scored the first hit on a flak ship, which was subsequently set on fire. A second flak ship was quickly destroyed by the heavy guns from Mauritius, while another was set on fire and driven onto the shoals. Only nineteen minutes after opening fire, all three German ships had been put out of action, with two sunk and the third aground and burning.

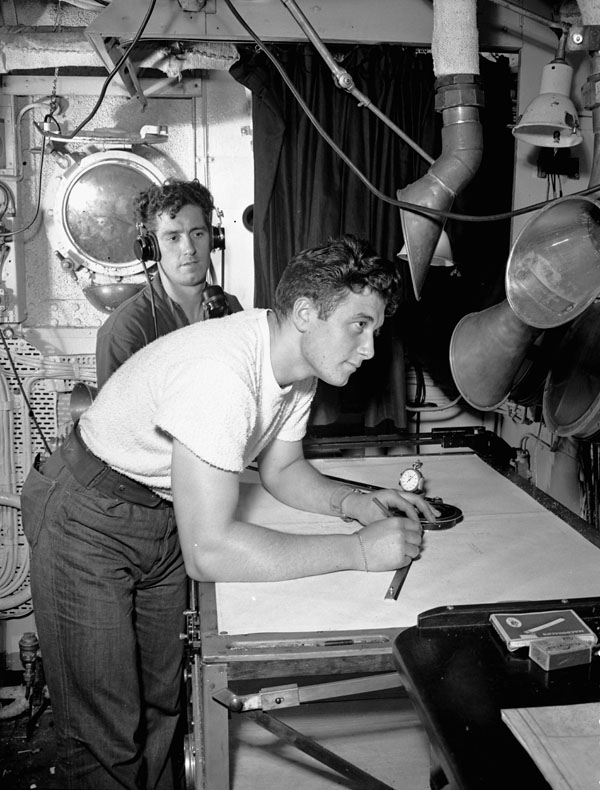
Radar plotters Able Seamen William Ewasiuk and Harry Henderson of HMCS Iroquois, 21 August 1944

In a second action two hours later, Iroquois detected another convoy of four ships departing from the harbour of Brest: an M-class minesweeper, two flak ships and a converted mine-destructor ship, or "Sperrbrecher". Using the radar on Iroquois again, Force 27 stalked the convoy at long range until 0408, when the German ships were illuminated with star shell. Upon opening fire, the British and Canadians quickly overwhelmed the convoy sinking two vessels and causing two others to collide in the confusion and burst into flames as they raced for shore, with surviving crew members jumping over the side as they went. One of these vessels capsized and sank while the other drove onto the rocks at full speed and exploded.

At dawn, Force 27 continued with another sweep around Audierne Bay in order to confirm the destruction of the German convoy. In the process a minesweeper came into view and was pounded with gunfire and driven onto a reef near Port Audierne. Iroquois finished off the minesweeper with a torpedo, while Ursa sent on a boarding party onto the other grounded vessel to grab eleven prisoners. The other one hundred and fifty survivors who were able to swim to shore were subsequently taken prisoner by the French Resistance. This was the last part of the action and the force consolidated and reviewed the damage they had caused.

== Aftermath ==
The final tally for the night was eight ships destroyed: one minesweeper driven ashore and heavily damaged, a flak ship, five armed trawlers, and the Sperrbrecher. Iroquois alone had fired a total of 1,197 rounds of 4.7-inch along with 231 rounds of star shell. Davis in his report attributed the success of the night's action to two principal causes: "some lucky guesses, and the excellence of Iroquois' radar and plotting teams". Although not known to Davis, it was actually Ultra intelligence that bore some responsibility for the luck of those guesses.

In the last week of August, another naval operation commenced, this time called Operation Assault, during which the cruiser HMS Bellona patrolled along the Biscay coast from Belle Isle near Lorient to Arcachon Point, south-west of Bordeaux. Continuing these sweeps through the remainder of the month, the Royal Navy and the Royal Canadian Navy patrolled off the coast. They sent landing parties ashore on the French mainland and outlying islands to secure them and ensured they were eliminated as potential bases of logistical supply to the Germans. The blockade of these Biscay ports, however, achieved impressive results independent of the campaign on land.

By the close of the Operation Kinetic, the combined Allied naval and air offensive eventually resulted in the reorganization of Kriegsmarine forces operating from fortress ports along the coast into Marineoberkommando West.

== Bibliography ==
- German, Tony (1990). The Sea Is at Our Gates: The History of the Canadian Navy. McClelland & Stewart Limited. ISBN 9780771032691.
- O'Hara, Vincent P. (2004). The German Fleet at War, 1939-1945. Naval Institute Press. ISBN 1-59114-651-8.
- Paterson, Lawrence (2001). First U-Boat Flotill. Pen and Sword. ISBN 9780850528169.
- Schull, Joseph. The Naval Service of Canada : Its Official History - The Far Distant Ships - An Official Account of Canadian Naval Operations in the Second World War. Minister of National Defense du Canada.
