= Igor Drljaca =

Bosnian-Canadian film writer and director

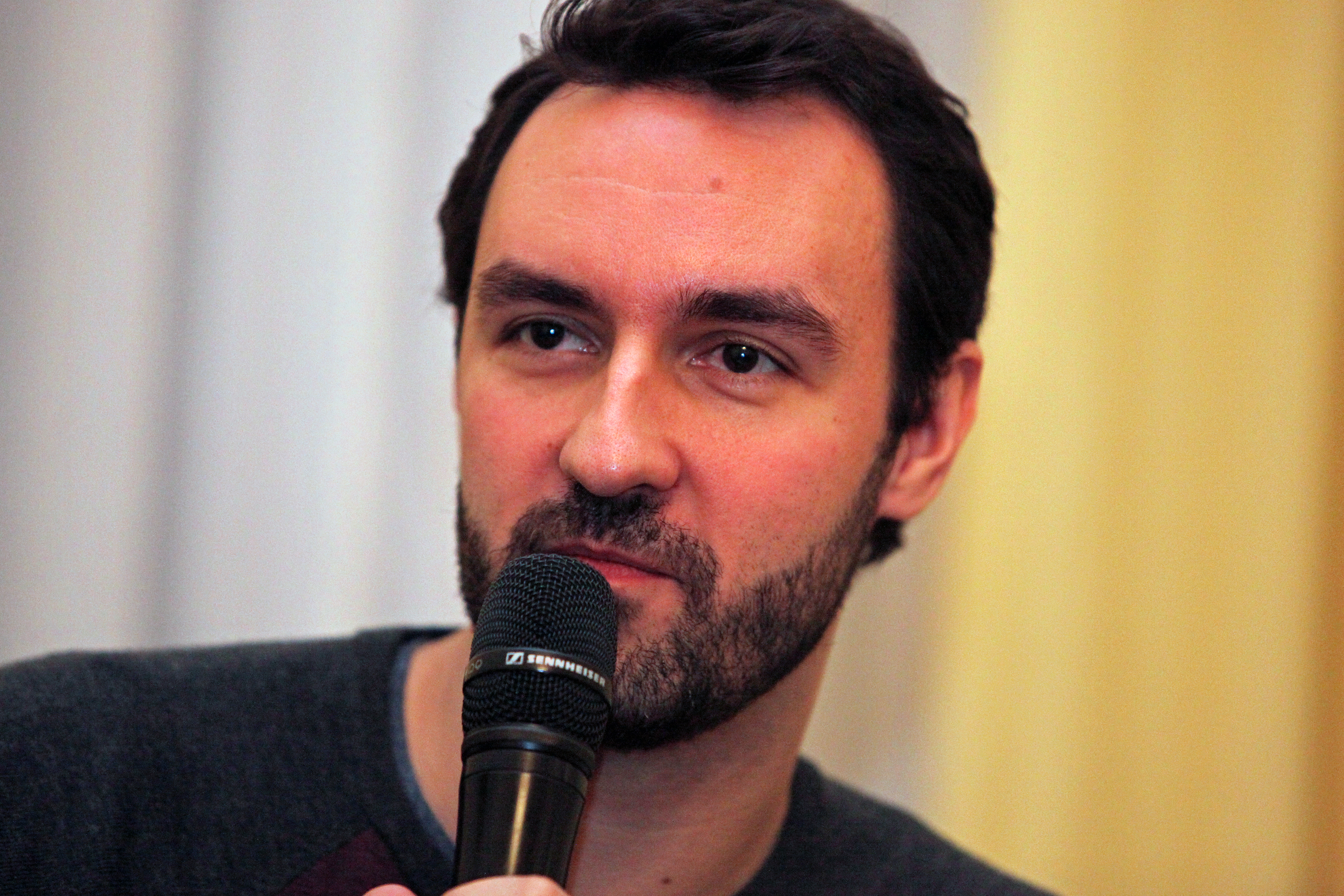
- Drljaca in 2016
- Born: Igor Drljača; 1983 (age 42–43); Sarajevo, SR Bosnia and Herzegovina, SFR Yugoslavia
- Education: York University
- Occupations: Filmmaker, professor
- Years active: 2009–present
- Known for: diasporic cinema
- Website: igordrljaca.com

Igor Drljaca (born 1983) is a Canadian and Bosnian-Herzegovinian film writer, producer and director. A graduate of York University, he cofounded the Canadian production company Timelapse Pictures with Albert Shin.

== Career ==
As a writer and director, he has made the narrative feature films Krivina (2012), The Waiting Room (2015) and The White Fortress (2021), as well as the feature documentary The Stone Speakers (2018). His short films include Woman in Purple (2009); On a Lonely Drive (2009); The Fuse: Or How I Burned Simon Bolivar (2011), which was a Canadian Screen Award nominee for Best Short Documentary at the 1st Canadian Screen Awards; and The Archivists (2020).

As a producer, he received a Canadian Screen Award nomination at the 3rd Canadian Screen Awards for Shin's Best Picture-nominated film In Her Place (2014), and was a producer of Bojan Bodružić's 2018 documentary film The Museum of Forgotten Triumphs.

At the 10th Canadian Screen Awards in 2022, Drljaca received a nomination for Best Original Screenplay for The White Fortress.

== Teaching ==
Drljaca is an associate professor in film production at the University of British Columbia's theatre and film department.
