= SS California (1923) =

British steam turbine ocean liner

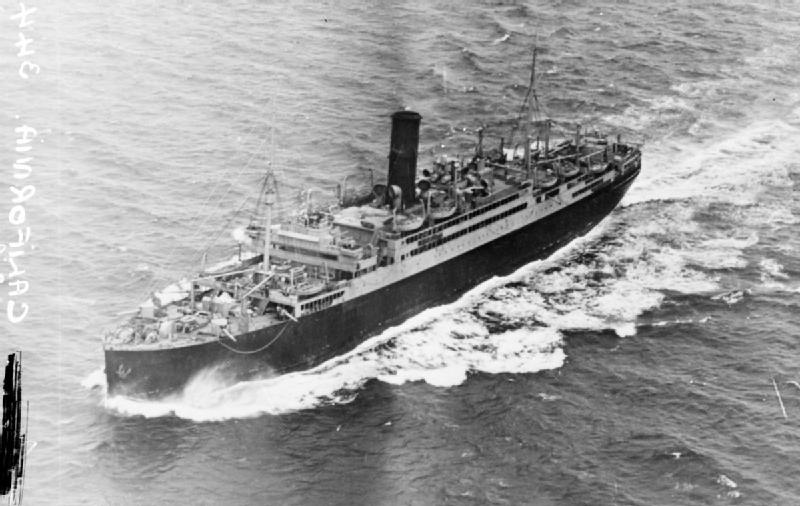
- California as armed merchant cruiser HMS California in World War II

History

United Kingdom
- Name: California
- Namesake: California
- Owner: Anchor Line
- Port of registry: (United Kingdom) Glasgow
- Route: Glasgow – New York
- Builder: Alexander Stephen & Sons, Glasgow
- Yard number: 494
- Launched: 17 April 1923
- Maiden voyage: 26 August 1923
- Fate: Acquired by the Royal Navy

United Kingdom
- Name: HMS California
- Operator: Royal Navy
- In service: 1939
- Identification: Official number: 1147871
- Fate: Crippled by German air attack 11 July 1943; sunk the next day by the Royal Navy

General characteristics
- Tonnage: 16,792 GRT, 9,930 NRT
- Length: 553.0 ft (168.6 m)
- Beam: 70.4 ft (21.5 m)
- Depth: 33.8 ft (10.3 m)
- Propulsion: 6 steam turbines; twin screw
- Speed: 16 kn (30 km/h)
- Armament: DEMS

SS California was a British 16,792 GRT steam turbine ocean liner built in Glasgow in 1923 for the Anchor Line. She was a sister ship of Cameronia, Tyrrhenia, Tuscania, Transylvania and Caledonia. In 1939 the Royal Navy requisitioned her. She was bombed and abandoned, along with the Duchess of York, west of Spain after a Luftwaffe attack in July 1943.

== Building ==
California was built by Alexander Stephen & Sons of Linthouse, Glasgow for the Anchor Line (Henderson Bros) Ltd. Her construction began in 1919 as part of an expansive building programme to replace a number of vessels lost during the First World War. Her completion was delayed due to the post-war recession, made worse for the shipping industry by the decline in immigration to the United States. She was launched on 17 April 1923 and christened by Lady Brocklebank, the wife of Anchor Line director Sir Aubrey Brocklebank 3rd Bt.

California was a twin-screw geared turbine steamer of 16,792 gross register tons. She was 578 feet 6 inches in length, 70 feet in width, and 42 feet 9 inches in depth. Her propulsion system consisted of two sets of Brown-Curtis turbine engines producing approximately 13,500 horse power. California had one funnel whilst her sisters RMS Transylvania and RMS Caledonia were later completed with three funnels; two additional 'dummy' funnels were added to enhance their appearance.

She began her trial trip on the River Clyde on 16 August 1923.

== Career ==
=== Pre-War ===
Alongside Tuscania, California was originally intended for the Mediterranean service to New York. However, the United States' introduction of immigration quotas and Fascist Italy's preferential treatment of Italian-registered ships led to these ships being transferred to the Glasgow to New York service. The California began her maiden voyage from Glasgow - Moville - New York on 26 August 1923, carrying around 1,700 passengers. In regular service, she carried passengers between Glasgow and New York via Derry and Boston.

She entered service with capacity for 251 first class, 465 second class, and 1044 third class passengers. With the increase in international tourism, the ship's passenger accommodations were redesigned in May 1929 for 206 passengers in cabin class, 440 in tourist class, and 485 in third class.

In the early 1930s, California also made a number of crossings in the winter season from Glasgow to Bombay. In addition to regular transatlantic service, California was also engaged in regular cruises to the Mediterranean. She also made world cruises in 1925 and 1927, followed by an extended itinerary in the West Indies in 1928. After the Great Depression, cruising became an increasing necessity for shipping lines to sustain income with declining transatlantic passenger lists. The Anchor Line scheduled a programme of short cruises from New York in 1931, with California offering short trips to Havana and Bermuda. She also made a short cruise to the Western Isles in June 1934.

=== World War II ===
In 1939 she was requisitioned by the Admiralty and converted to an Armed Merchant Cruiser, and from 1942 she was a troopship.

==== Loss ====
On 8 July 1943 the small fast Convoy Faith, comprising Port Fairy, the troopships Duchess of York and California, and escorted by the destroyer HMS Douglas and frigate HMS Moyola, sailed Port Glasgow, Scotland, for Freetown, Sierra Leone. On the evening of 10 July the convoy rendezvoused with the Canadian destroyer HMCS Iroquois 500 miles (800 km) WSW of Land's End. On 11 July 1943 when about 300 miles (480 km) west of Vigo, Spain, the convoy was attacked by three Focke-Wulf Fw 200 aircraft of Kampfgeschwader 40 from Merignac near Bordeaux.

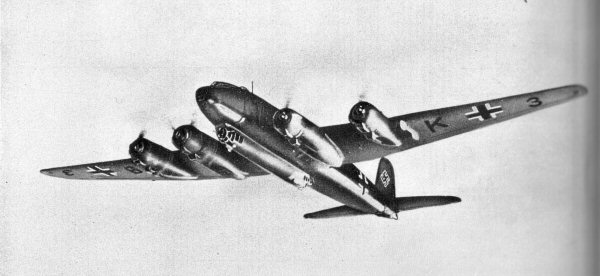
Focke Wulf Fw 200

Accurate high-altitude bombing left Duchess of York and California in flames. The attack cost the lives of 46 servicemen and crew, and both ships were abandoned. It was feared the flames from the troopships would attract U-boats, so in the early hours of 12 July they were sunk by Royal Navy torpedoes in position 41°15′N 15°24′W.
