= Yoon Da-gyeong =

South Korean actress

Yoon Da-gyeong (Korean: 윤다경; born 10 July 1971 in Seoul, South Korea, also known as Yoon Da-kyung) is a South Korean actress. She is best known to North American audiences for her performance in the film In Her Place, for which she garnered a Canadian Screen Award nomination for Best Actress at the 3rd Canadian Screen Awards in 2015, and a Wildflower Film Award nomination for Best Actress at the 3rd Wildflower Film Awards in 2016. Yoon Da-gyeong is also known for her role in the 2009 South Korean thriller movie White Night.

== Filmography ==
=== Television ===
- Good Partner (SBS, 2024) cameo
- Queen of Divorce (JTBC, 2024) cameo
- Pyramid Game (TVING, 2024)
- Duty After School (TVING, 2023) cameo
- The Glory (Netflix, 2022–2023)
- Ghost Doctor (tvN, 2022)
- Work Later, Drink Now (TVING, 2021–22)
- The Devil Judge (tvN, 2021)
- Hide and Seek (MBC, 2018)
- KBS Drama Special: "If We Were a Season" (KBS2, 2017)
- Sweet Revenge (Oksusu, 2017)
- School 2017 (KBS2, 2017)
- Guardian: The Lonely and Great God (tvN, 2016)
- The Good Wife (tvN, 2016)
- Babysitter (KBS2, 2016)
- Five Enough (KBS2, 2016)
- Blade Man (KBS2, 2014)
- KBS Drama Special: "The Dirge Singer" (KBS2, 2014)
- Mimi (Mnet, 2014)
- Love Again (JTBC, 2012)

=== Film ===
- Single in Seoul (2023)
- Bluebeard (2017)
- Because I Love You (2017)
- Remember You (2016)
- Fatal Intuition (2015)
- The Exclusive: Beat the Devil's Tattoo (2015)
- In Her Place (2014)
- Daughter (2014)
- Red Carpet (2014)
- Obsessed (2014)
- Kong's Family (2013)
- Toucn (2012)
- Secrets, Objects (2011)
- Link, 2009 (2011)
- Haunters (2010)
- Dreams Come True (2010)
- On the Pitch (2010)
- White Night (2009)
- City of Damnation (2009)
- Roommates (2006)
- Love Is a Crazy Thing (2005)
- The Big Swindle (2004)
- Ardor (2002)
