= AsiaFest =

Night market in Alberta, Canada

- Genre: Night market
- Location: Currents of Windermere, Edmonton, Alberta, Canada
- Date: Annually on Mid-Autumn Festival
- Status: Active
- Organised by: AsiaFest Alberta Association
- Social media (IG/FB): asiafest.yeg
- Website: https://www.asiafestyeg.ca/

AsiaFest is an annual Asian cultural night market held in Edmonton, Alberta, Canada. Established in 2022, the event features food vendors, cultural performances, and community activities, and is organised by the AsiaFest Alberta Association, a nonprofit volunteer-run organisation.

The annual event is recognised by the City of Edmonton as one of the city’s largest night markets and has been featured by local media, also receiving regular sponsors every year.

== Overview ==
AsiaFest is organised and managed by the AsiaFest Alberta Association, a volunteer-run nonprofit organisation. The primary mission of the festival is to provide economic and cultural opportunities for local entrepreneurs, small businesses, and encourage performers to chase their dreams.

The multi-day event is designed around the traditional Asian night market concept, acting as a public platform for both commercial and cultural exchange. The festival features two main areas of programming:

- Vendors: The marketplace consists of both food and merchandise vendors. The food section focuses on diverse Asian street food and local restaurant startups, while the retail section highlights local artisans, small businesses, and community organisations.
- Performances: The festival hosts a dedicated performance stage featuring young musicians, traditional dancers, martial arts demonstrators, and performers aim to represent their culture. These showcases are intended to provide an stage opportunity and experience for local talent.

== Events ==
Year	Date	Theme	Vendors	Extreme Eating Contest
2022	September 9–11	/	10	/
2023	September 15–17	/	20	/
2024	September 13–15	Japan	60	Instant noodles
2025	January 31 - February 2	Lunar New Year	70	/
2025	September 12–14	Malay-Singapore-Indonesia	100	Dumplings
2026	September 25–27	Moon is Big!	120+	/

== History ==
AsiaFest began in September 2022 as the Taste of Asia Night Market, founded by a group of newcomers and long-time immigrants who shared a vision of promoting Asian culture, creating opportunities for local entrepreneurs, and celebrating the Mid-Autumn Festival with the wider community.

The inaugural event featured approximately 10 vendors and exceeded expectations, drawing strong attendance throughout the weekend.

Since its founding, the festival has expanded significantly. What began as a small community gathering has grown into one of Edmonton's largest Asian cultural festivals and night markets. By its third year, the event had evolved into a major cultural celebration featuring dozens of vendors, themed programming, live entertainment, cultural performances, and interactive activities for visitors of all ages. Local media have described the festival as a "beloved Asian night market," highlighting its unique combination of food, culture, performances, and community engagement.

The festival was originally known as Taste of Asia Night Market during its first two years. In 2024, organisers officially rebranded the event as AsiaFest to establish a distinct identity and avoid confusion with other well-known Edmonton festivals, including the long-running Taste of Edmonton.

By 2025, AsiaFest had grown to welcome more than 100 vendors and was recognised by the City of Edmonton as one of the city's largest night markets. The festival has received support from corporate sponsors, community partners, and public organisations, including financial institutions, provincial initiatives, and cultural programs.

In addition to its annual night market, the AsiaFest Alberta Association has organised other cultural events and community initiatives, including Chinese New Year celebrations and special community outreach programs. As a volunteer-run nonprofit organisation, proceeds from AsiaFest are reinvested into projects that benefit the local community and support cultural engagement throughout the year.
