= Albert Shin =

Canadian filmmaker

- Born: Newmarket, Ontario, Canada
- Education: York University
- Occupation: Filmmaker
- Years active: 2008–present
- Known for: In Her Place, Disappearance at Clifton Hill
- Website: timelapsepictures.ca

Albert Shin is a Canadian filmmaker, best known for his critically acclaimed Canadian Screen Award-nominated films In Her Place (2014) and Disappearance at Clifton Hill (2019). He works frequently with collaborator Igor Drljaca.

== Early life ==
Shin was born in Canada and raised in Newmarket, Ontario. His parents are of South Korean descent. Shin later studied film production at York University, where he created several short films.

== Career ==
Before making the leap into features, Shin directed the short film Kai's Place, and the short-run television series In Counseling.

His feature directorial debut, Point Traverse, was released in 2009. The microbudget film screened at several film festivals, including the Wisconsin Film Festival.

=== In Her Place ===
His second feature film was released in 2014; it was acclaimed by critics and screened at festivals around the world. For his work on In Her Place, Shin won several awards, and garnered several Canadian Screen Award nominations at the 3rd Canadian Screen Awards, including nominations in the categories of Best Director and Best Original Screenplay.

The film received positive reviews from critics upon release and holds an 80% rating on Rotten Tomatoes. Jay Weissberg wrote, in his Variety review, "an acutely observed psychodrama from sophomore helmer Albert Shin, powered by three sterling performances." NOW Magazine called it "an expertly plotted drama that packs a paralyzing emotional gut punch." The Globe and Mail praised it as "thematically ambitious, and blunt in its portrayal of the bloody-minded demands of domestic bliss."

=== Disappearance at Clifton Hill ===
Five years later, Shin co-wrote and directed the 2019 thriller Disappearance at Clifton Hill, starring Tuppence Middleton, Hannah Gross, Marie-Josée Croze, Eric Johnson and the Canadian filmmaker David Cronenberg. The film, originally titled Clifton Hill, was partially inspired by the motel Shin's parents owned in Niagara Falls, Ontario. It premiered at the 2019 Toronto International Film Festival and was released theatrically in the U.S. and Canada on February 28, 2020.

=== Timelapse Pictures ===
Shin founded the Toronto-based production company Timelapse Pictures with producing partner Igor Drljaca.

== Filmography ==
Year	Film	Type	Director	Writer	Producer	Notes
2008	Kai's Place	Short film	Yes	Yes	No	
2009	Point Traverse	Feature film	Yes	Yes	Yes	
2012	Krivina	Feature film	No	No	Yes	Directed by Igor Drljaca
2014	In Her Place	Feature film	Yes	Yes	Yes	
2015	The Waiting Room	Feature film	No	No	Yes	Directed by Igor Drljaca
2017	Lira's Forest	Short film	No	No	Yes	Directed by Connor Jessup
2018	The Stone Speakers	Documentary	No	No	Yes	Directed by Igor Drljaca
2019	Disappearance at Clifton Hill	Feature film	Yes	Yes	No	
2020	The Archivists	Short film	No	No	Yes	
2021	Together	Short film	Yes			
2023	The King Tide	Feature film	No	Yes	No	Directed by Christian Sparkes
2025	Violence	Feature film	No	No	Yes	Directed by Connor Marsden

Shin has also edited his first two features, as well as Drljaca's Krivina (2012) and Jessup's Boy (2015).

== Awards ==
Year	Award	Category	Nominated work	Result	Ref(s)
2014	Toronto Film Critics Association Award	Jay Scott Prize	In Her Place	Won	
2015	Canadian Screen Award	Best Motion Picture	In Her Place	Nominated	
2015	Canadian Screen Award	Best Director	In Her Place	Nominated	
2015	Canadian Screen Award	Best Screenplay	In Her Place	Nominated	
2015	Canadian Screen Award	Best Editing	In Her Place	Nominated	
2016	Wildflower Film Award	Best Director (Narrative Films)	In Her Place	Nominated	
