= Ahn Ji-hye =

South Korean actress (born 1987)

Ahn Ji-hye (Korean: 안지혜; born 1987) is a South Korean actress. She is best known to North American audiences for her performance in the film In Her Place, for which she garnered a Canadian Screen Award nomination for Best Actress at the 3rd Canadian Screen Awards in 2015, and a Wildflower Film Award nomination for Best New Actress at the 3rd Wildflower Film Awards in 2016.
