= SS Duchess of York =

Steam ship

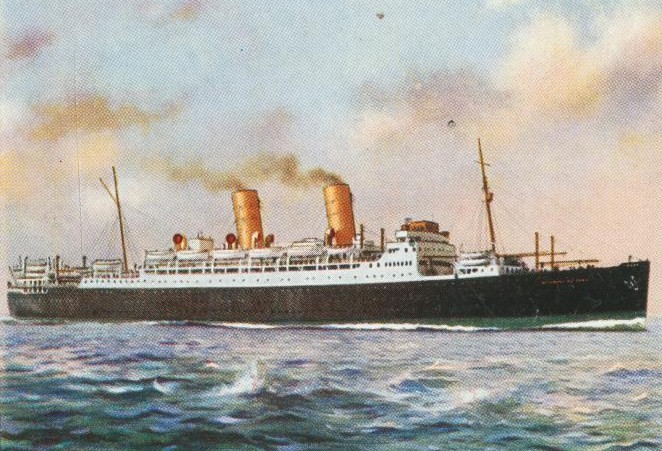
- Duchess of York

History

United Kingdom
- Name: Duchess of York
- Namesake: Elizabeth Bowes-Lyon, Duchess of York
- Owner: Canadian Pacific Railway Co
- Operator: Canadian Pacific Steamships Ltd
- Port of registry: London
- Route: Liverpool – Quebec – Montreal (Apr–Nov); Liverpool – St John (Nov–Apr)
- Builder: John Brown & Company, Clydebank
- Yard number: 524
- Launched: 28 September 1928
- Completed: March 1929
- Maiden voyage: 22 March 1929
- Identification: UK official number 161202; Code letters LCVN (until 1933); Call sign GSYN (from 1934)
- Fate: Damaged by German air attack 11 July 1943. Sunk the next day by the Royal Navy.

General characteristics
- Type: 1928–40: Ocean liner; 1940–43: Troop ship
- Tonnage: 20,021 GRT; Tonnage under deck 11,063 (until 1934); Tonnage under deck 14,366 (from 1935); 11,816 NRT (until 1932); 11,822 NRT (1934–37); 11,722 NRT (from 1939)
- Length: 581.9 ft (177.4 m)
- Beam: 75.2 ft (22.9 m)
- Draught: 27 ft 6 3/4 in (8.4 m)
- Depth: 41.7 ft (12.7 m)
- Decks: 4
- Installed power: 3,557 NHP
- Propulsion: Six steam turbines, twin propellers
- Speed: 18 knots (33 km/h; 21 mph)
- Capacity: As built; 580 first class; 480 tourist class; 510 third class
- Crew: 510
- Sensors & processing systems: Direction finding equipment; Submarine signalling equipment (removed by 1937); Echo sounding equipment (added by 1937)
- Notes: Sister ships: Duchess of Atholl, Duchess of Bedford, Duchess of Richmond

SS Duchess of York was one of a class of four steam turbine ocean liners built in Glasgow in 1927–29 for Canadian Pacific Steamships Ltd's transatlantic service between Britain and Canada.

In the Second World War Duchess of York was converted into a troop ship. In 1943 an attack by enemy aircraft killed 27 people aboard her and left the ship burning and badly damaged. The Royal Navy sank her the next day.

== Pre-war service ==
Duchess of York was ordered as a sister ship to Duchess of Atholl, Duchess of Bedford and Duchess of Richmond. The four were cabin liners built for Canadian Pacific's transatlantic service. Duchess of York was employed on the Liverpool to Quebec and Montreal route. During the winter months when the Saint Lawrence River was frozen (typically November to April), she sailed to Saint John, New Brunswick. The four ships were nicknamed the "Drunken Duchesses" for their "lively" motion in heavy seas.

The Duchess was built by John Brown & Company of Clydebank. She was to be named Duchess of Cornwall, but for £250, Red Funnel Line agreed to swap names with their 302 GRT paddle steamer Duchess of York, which had been launched in 1896. With that, the ocean liner Duchess of York was launched by her namesake, Elizabeth Bowes-Lyon, the Duchess of York, on September 28, 1928.

Her first captain between 1929 and 1934 was Ronald Niel Stuart, VC whose First World War service record entitled him to fly the Blue Ensign whilst he was aboard. Following his departure, the liner was employed briefly on the New York CIty to Bermuda route before returning to her original passage.

In 1939 it was proposed that Duchess of York or one of her sisters be modified for use on Canadian-Australasian Line's transpacific route between Sydney and Vancouver via Auckland, Suva and Honolulu. She would replace RMS Niagara, which was launched in 1913, as CP Chairman Sir Edward Beatty said that the cost of building new liners for the route was too high. Canadian Pacific and the Union Steamship Company of New Zealand jointly owned the Canadian-Australasian Line, which faced subsidised competition from the US Matson Line.

== War service and loss ==
On 20 June 1940, Duchess of York left Liverpool for Quebec City, Canada, carrying 2,112 Category A internees, some captured German servicemen, some German civilians, alongside civilian refugees. Amongst those on board were Ernst Hanfstaengl and Gustav Lachmann. The voyage was not without incident, with plans to storm the bridge and hijack the ship to Hamburg, and the shooting of one of the POWs.

A month later, on 27 July 1940, Duchess of York left Greenock, Scotland bound for Halifax, Nova Scotia, taking evacuated children under the Children's Overseas Reception Board scheme. She returned to Scotland and made a second trip taking another batch of children from Liverpool on 10 August 1940, bound for Canada.

She was recommissioned by the British Admiralty as a troopship and used early in the war to transport Canadian soldiers to Britain, returning to Canada carrying RAF aircrew and German prisoners of war (among them legendary escapee Franz von Werra in early January 1941). On 9 July 1943, she sailed from Greenock as part of the small, fast Convoy Faith, for Freetown, Sierra Leone, in company with California and the cargo ship Port Fairy.

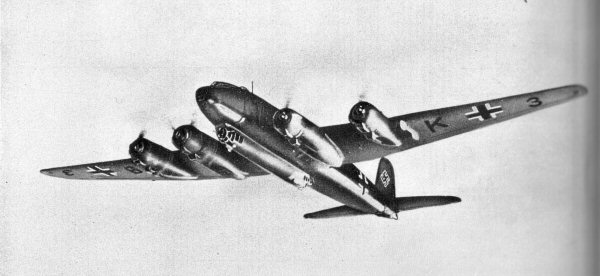
Focke Wulf Fw 200

Two days later, the convoy was about 300 miles west of Vigo, Spain when it was attacked by three Focke-Wulf Fw 200 aircraft of Kampfgeschwader 40 based at Merignac near Bordeaux. The accurate high-altitude bombing set both Duchess of York and California ablaze. The convoy escorts HMCS Iroquois, HMS Douglas and HMS Moyola, together with Port Fairy, rescued all but 27 people from the ship. Fearing the flames from the ships would attract U-boats, the Royal Navy sank Duchess of York and California by torpedoes in position 41°15′N 15°24′W in the early hours of 12 July.
