= In Her Place (2014 film) =

- Film poster
- Directed by: Albert Shin
- Written by: Albert Shin; Pearl Ball-Harding
- Produced by: Albert Shin; Igor Drljaca
- Starring: Gil Hae-yeon; Ahn Ji-hye; Yoon Da-gyeong
- Cinematography: Moon Myeong-hwan
- Edited by: Albert Shin
- Music by: Alexandre Klinke
- Production company: TimeLapse Pictures
- Distributed by: A71 Productions
- Release date: September 4, 2014 (TIFF)
- Running time: 115 minutes
- Country: Canada
- Language: Korean

In Her Place (Korean: 인 허 플레이스) is a 2014 Canadian-South Korean film directed and written by Albert Shin. The film follows a wealthy woman who moves in to the countryside home of a pregnant teenage girl and her mother and waits to adopt the unborn child.

It premiered on September 4, 2014, in the Toronto International Film Festival's Discovery program.

== Plot ==
Inspired by Korean culture's strong stigma against adoption, the film stars Gil Hae-yeon and Ahn Ji-hye as a mother and daughter living on a farm in South Korea. When the teenage daughter becomes pregnant, a woman (Yoon Da-gyeong) arrives from Seoul to propose a secret adoption, conditional on her staying with them for the duration of the pregnancy so that she can hide the adoption when she returns to Seoul after the baby's birth.

== Cast ==
- Gil Hae-yeon as Mother
- Ahn Ji-hye as Girl
- Yoon Da-gyeong as Woman
- Kim Chang-hwan as Police Officer

== Production ==
The film was shot entirely in Korea at Shin's family farm. Regarding his inspirations for the film, Shin said:

I had this idea of, "What if I bring together three women? And what if they were of different generations? And what if I told the film from three different perspectives?" And, instead of it being vignettes I made it one linear film and switched the point of view, all contained in one space.

== Release ==
=== Critical reception ===
On review aggregation website Rotten Tomatoes, the film holds an approval rating of 80% based on 5 reviews, and an average rating of 7/10.

Variety's Jay Weissberg described the film as "an acutely observed psychodrama from sophomore helmer Albert Shin, powered by three sterling performances." Radheyan Simonpillai in NOW Magazine called it "an expertly plotted drama that packs a paralyzing emotional gut punch." The Toronto Star's Linda Barnard wrote, "Making good use of the mist-shrouded rural South Korea setting to create moody tension, Shin's film builds slowly to a shattering finale that shocks as much as it surprises."

=== Accolades ===
The film was included in the list of Canada's Top Ten feature films of 2014, selected by a panel of filmmakers and industry professionals organized by Toronto International Film Festival. Shin was awarded the Jay Scott Prize at the 2014 Toronto Film Critics Association Awards for the film.

Award	Date of ceremony	Category	Recipient(s)	Result	Ref(s)
Canadian Screen Awards	March 1, 2015	Best Motion Picture	Albert Shin, Igor Drljaca, Yoon Hyun Chan	Nominated	
Canadian Screen Awards	March 1, 2015	Best Director	Albert Shin	Nominated	
Canadian Screen Awards	March 1, 2015	Best Actress	Yoon Da-gyeong	Nominated	
Canadian Screen Awards	March 1, 2015	Best Actress	Ahn Ji-hye	Nominated	
Canadian Screen Awards	March 1, 2015	Best Supporting Actress	Gil Hae-yeon	Nominated	
Canadian Screen Awards	March 1, 2015	Best Screenplay	Albert Shin	Nominated	
Canadian Screen Awards	March 1, 2015	Best Editing	Albert Shin	Nominated	
Wildflower Film Awards	April 7, 2016	Best Director (Narrative Films)	Albert Shin	Nominated	
Wildflower Film Awards	April 7, 2016	Best Actress	Yoon Da-gyeong	Nominated	
Wildflower Film Awards	April 7, 2016	Best Cinematography	Moon Myeong-hwan	Nominated	
Wildflower Film Awards	April 7, 2016	Best New Actress	Ahn Ji-hye	Nominated	
Wildflower Film Awards	April 7, 2016	Best Supporting Actor/Actress	Gil Hae-yeon	Won	
