= HMCS Iroquois (G89) =

Royal Canadian Navy destroyer

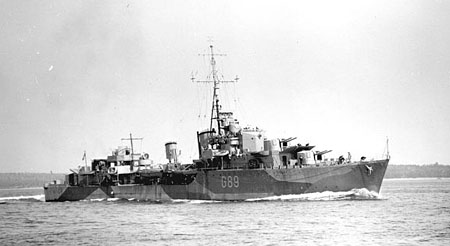
- HMCS Iroquois (G89) underway

History

Canada
- Name: Iroquois
- Namesake: The Iroquois people
- Ordered: 5 April 1940
- Builder: Vickers-Armstrongs, High Walker
- Laid down: 19 September 1940
- Launched: 23 September 1941
- Commissioned: 30 November 1942
- Decommissioned: 22 February 1946
- Identification: Pennant number; G89
- Recommissioned: October 1951
- Decommissioned: 24 October 1962
- Identification: DDE 217
- Honours and awards: Atlantic 1943; Arctic 1943–45; Biscay 1943–44; Norway 1945; Korea 1952–53
- Fate: Scrapped 1966

General characteristics
- Class & type: Tribal-class destroyer
- Displacement: 1,959 long tons (1,990 t) tons standard; 2,519 long tons (2,559 t) deep load
- Length: 377 ft (115 m)
- Beam: 37.5 ft (11.4 m)
- Draught: 11.2 ft (3.4 m)
- Propulsion: 2 shafts, 3 Admiralty 3-drum type boilers, 2 Parsons geared steam turbines, 44,000 shp (33,000 kW)
- Speed: 36 knots (67 km/h)
- Complement: 259 (14 officers, 245 ratings)
- Sensors & processing systems: 1 type 268 radar; 1 type 271 radar; 1 type 291 radar; 1 × Mk.III fire control director with Type 285 fire control radar; 1 type 144 sonar; 1 type 144Q sonar; 1 type 147F sonar
- Armament: 3 × twin QF 4.7-inch (120 mm) guns; 1 × 4 in (102 mm)/45 Mk.16 twin guns; 1 × quadruple mount 40 mm/39 2-pounder gun; 6 × 20 mm Oerlikon cannons; 1 quad launcher with Mk.IX torpedoes (4 × 21 inch (533 mm) torpedo tubes); 1 rail + 2 Mk.IV throwers (Mk.VII depth charges)

HMCS Iroquois was a Tribal-class destroyer that served in the Royal Canadian Navy during the Second World War and Korean War. She was named for the Iroquois First Nations. Iroquois was the first ship to bear this name and the first ship of the class to serve with the Royal Canadian Navy.

== Design and description ==
The Tribals were designed to fight heavily armed destroyers of other navies, such as the Japanese Fubuki class. Canada chose the design based on its armament, with the size and power of the Tribal class allowing them to act more like small cruisers than as fleet destroyers. Iroquois was among the first batch of Tribal-class destroyers ordered by the RCN in 1940–1941. They were ordered with modified ventilation and heating systems for North Atlantic winter service. Design modifications were made after deficiencies were noted in Iroquois, the lead ship of the Canadian Tribals.

Iroquois, as one of the British-built Tribal-class destroyers, was 335 ft 6 in (102.26 m) long between perpendiculars and 377 ft (115 m) long overall with a beam of 36 ft 6 in (11.13 m) and a draught of 13 ft (4.0 m). As built, the destroyer displaced 1,927 long tons (1,958 t) standard and 2,745 long tons (2,789 t) at deep load. Iroquois had a complement of 14 officers and 245 ratings.

The destroyer was propelled by two shafts driven by two Parsons geared turbines powered by steam created by three Admiralty-type three drum boilers. This created 44,000 shp (33,000 kW) and gave the ship a maximum speed of 36.5 kn (67.6 km/h; 42.0 mph) . The destroyers could carry 505–516 long tons (513–524 t) of fuel oil.

As built, Iroquois was fitted with six quick firing QF 4.7-inch (120 mm)} Mk XII guns placed in three twin turrets, designated 'A', 'B' and 'Y' from bow to stern. (Note: Mark XII = Mark 12. Britain used Roman numerals to denote Marks (models) of ordnance until after World War II.) The turrets were placed on 40° mountings with open-backed shields. The ship also had one twin turret of QF 4-inch (102 mm) Mk XVI guns in the 'X' position. For secondary anti-aircraft armament, the destroyer was equipped with four single-mounted 2-pounder "pom-pom" guns. The vessel was also fitted with four 21-inch (533 mm) torpedo tubes for Mk IX torpedoes.

== Construction and career ==
Iroquois was ordered on 5 April 1940 as part of the 1940 shipbuilding programme. The destroyer was laid down on 19 September 1940 by Vickers-Armstrongs at High Walker in the United Kingdom and launched 23 September the following year. Iroquois was originally laid down as Athabaskan. However, due to bomb damage, she and her sister had their names switched in order to ensure Iroquois commissioned first. She was commissioned into the Royal Canadian Navy at Newcastle on Tyne on 30 November 1942. The destroyer was not completed until 30 January 1943.

Following her completion, Iroquois began sea trials, suffering storm damage near the Faroes, which included a bent keel and required repairs. Further trials continued in the North Sea until May 1943 when she departed for Plymouth. From there the destroyer was used as a convoy escort on Gibraltar convoys. On 11 July, three Focke-Wulf Fw 200 Condors from Kampfgeschwader 40 attacked a troop transport convoy west of Porto in the Bay of Biscay. Iroquois was attacked by the aircraft, missing the destroyer with bombs 200 yards (180 m) astern. The German aircraft hit SS California and SS Duchess of York which were abandoned. Iroquois rescued 628 survivors from Duchess of York. On 19 July an event termed "incident" in official reports took place where according to the inquiry afterwards, a large section of the ship's company refused to perform their duties. Iroquois was among the destroyers deployed to cover escort forces attacking U-boats in the Bay of Biscay from 12 June to 2 August 1943.

=== Northern operations ===
Following her return to the United Kingdom, Iroquois was assigned to escort convoys heading to the Soviet Union over the following months. From 1 to 11 October, Iroquois and the destroyers Huron and Onslaught transported supplies to Murmansk for the escorts that remained there in the summer. Beginning in November, Iroquois provided support to Russian convoys, beginning with convoy JW 54A from Loch Ewe on 18–24 November and convoy RA 54B from Molotvsk on 28 November. In late December, Iroquois escorted the convoy JW 55B. It came under air attack on 23 December, but was unscathed. The convoy sailed as a lure for the German battleship Scharnhorst, which was sunk by British forces on 26 December. On 31 December, the warship was among the escort for RA 55B which departed Kola Inlet on 31 December and reached Loch Ewe on 8 January without loss.

=== English Channel and the end of the war ===
In February 1944, she sailed to Halifax to undergo a refit that would keep her out of action until early June. She returned to the UK and was assigned to the 10th Destroyer Flotilla in preparation for the Invasion of Normandy. After D-day, she carried out patrols of the English Channel and the Bay of Biscay. During this period, Iroquois took part in many operations, including Kinetic, the objective of which was to eliminate the German navy all along the French Atlantic ports, taking part in three actions, including the Battle of Audierne Bay in August 1944.

On 5 August 1944, a force comprising the cruiser Bellona and the destroyers Tartar, Ashanti, Haida and Iroquois engaged and sank the German minesweepers M 263 and M 486 and the patrol boat V 414, coastal launch Otto from a German convoy north of Île d'Yeu. Iroquois was responsible for the sinking of two of the vessels. On 14 August, Iroquois joined the destroyer Ursa and cruiser Mauritius to attack a German force off Les Sables d'Olonne and sank Sperrbrecher 157; they also badly damaged M 275 and ran M 385 aground. On 22–23 August Mauritius, Ursa and Iroquois sank V 702, V 717, V 720, V 729 and V 730 of Audierne. The destroyer continued patrolling the Bay of Biscay and the English Channel until October 1944, when she transferred to Scapa Flow.

Iroquois rejoined the Home Fleet in March 1945 at Scapa Flow. The ship was part of the screening force for aircraft carriers on 19 March and again on 24 March, which were performing air strikes along coastal Norway. She then escorted one more convoy to the Soviet Union. On 16 April, Iroquois departed as part of the escort of JW 66. From 29 April-2 May, Iroquois participated in the last convoy battle of the war as part of the escort for convoy RA 66. Iroquois and Haida were just missed by torpedoes in an attack by U-427. They in turn pursued the submarine in which by the end of the engagement, 678 depth charge explosions were counted without sinking the submarine. Iroquois remained in British waters until the German surrender.

Following the capitulation, Iroquois was part of Crown Prince Olav's return to Norway after its liberation. She then sailed on to Copenhagen where she was an escort to the German cruisers Prinz Eugen and Nürnberg until their formal surrender. The destroyer returned to Canada and began a tropicalization refit that was halted upon the surrender of Japan. Iroquois was then paid off on 22 February 1946.

=== Cold War service ===
Beginning in 1947, Iroquois underwent conversion to a destroyer escort, the first of her class to undergo the alterations. The changes involved her 4.7-inch main armament which were replaced with 4-inch guns in the 'A' and 'B' turret positions; in the 'X', a twin 3-inch (76 mm)/50 calibre gun mount was installed and in the 'Y' site, two Squid anti-submarine mortars were located. (Note: The 50 calibre denotes the length of the gun. This means that the length of the gun barrel is 50 times the bore diameter.) Other alterations included an aluminum lattice with new radar. Iroquois was equipped with Type 275, SPS-10, SPS-6, Type 293 and 262 radars and Type 140 and 174 sonars. She emerged from her refit on 24 June 1949 and was recommissioned as a training ship with Lieutenant Commander T. C. Pullen in command. She was renumbered as DDE217.

On 21 October 1951, Commander William Landymore assumed command of the ship as a regular vessel of the Royal Canadian Navy. Iroquois served off Korea during the Korean War, commanded by Landymore. Iroquois departed Halifax on 21 April 1952 and arrived in theatre to replace Cayuga on 12 June. Her first assignment was carrier screening on Korean the west coast. For the majority of 1952, Iroquois supported the Island campaign off the west coast. On 2 October, Iroquois in concert with USS Marsh, was bombarding a rail line on the east coast southwest of Songjin when she was hit by a shell on the starboard side abreast of 'B' gun. Two men were killed and eleven injured, with one dying later of his injuries. The destroyer remained on station for two weeks before returning to Sasebo. These were the only Royal Canadian Navy casualties in the war. Iroquois saw service screening the aircraft carrier HMS Glory and an inshore patrol on the west coast before sailing for Canada on 26 November. She was replaced by Athabaskan. Iroquois returned to Halifax on 8 January 1953.

Iroquois sailed for Korea on 29 April 1953 and upon her return to the theatre on 18 June 1953, the destroyer returned to the Chodo area to support the Island campaign off the west coast. The destroyer supported the Island campaign in the Haeju area and performed screening missions with carriers off the west coast before the end of hostilities on 29 July 1953. Following the end of hostilities, Iroquois was deployed evacuating islands that had been handed back to North Korea in the armistice and completed the first post-armistice patrol. On 1 November 1953, Lieutenant Commander S. G. Moore assumed command of the vessel. Iroquois remained in theatre until 1 January 1954. The destroyer returned to Halifax on 10 February 1954 via the Suez Canal, circumnavigating the globe in the process. Iroquois made one further post-Armistice patrol off the Korean coasts, departing Halifax on 1 July 1954 and arriving off Korea on 22 August. The ship departed the theatre on 26 December and returned to Halifax via the Suez Canal again on 19 March 1955. Iroquois circumnavigated the globe a second time on her return to Halifax.

She returned to her training role and remained as such until 1962. Iroquois was paid off at Halifax on 24 October 1962 and laid up at Sydney. In 1966 the vessel was taken to Bilbao, Spain and broken up in September.

== Ship's badge ==
The ship's badge is described as a blazon or, the head of an Iroquois brave, couped at the base of the neck, properly coloured and wearing two eagle feathers in his hair and a gold ring pendant from the ear. During the Second World War and up to 1948 when official badges were created for the Royal Canadian Navy, Iroquois had an unofficial crest. This crest consisted of an Iroquois brave, red, drawing a bow on a black background. Below the warrior was the ship's motto "Ongwanonsionni" which translates as "Relentless in pursuit". Above the warrior was a ship's crown.

== See also ==
- List of ships of the Canadian Navy
