= SS Missanabie (1914) =

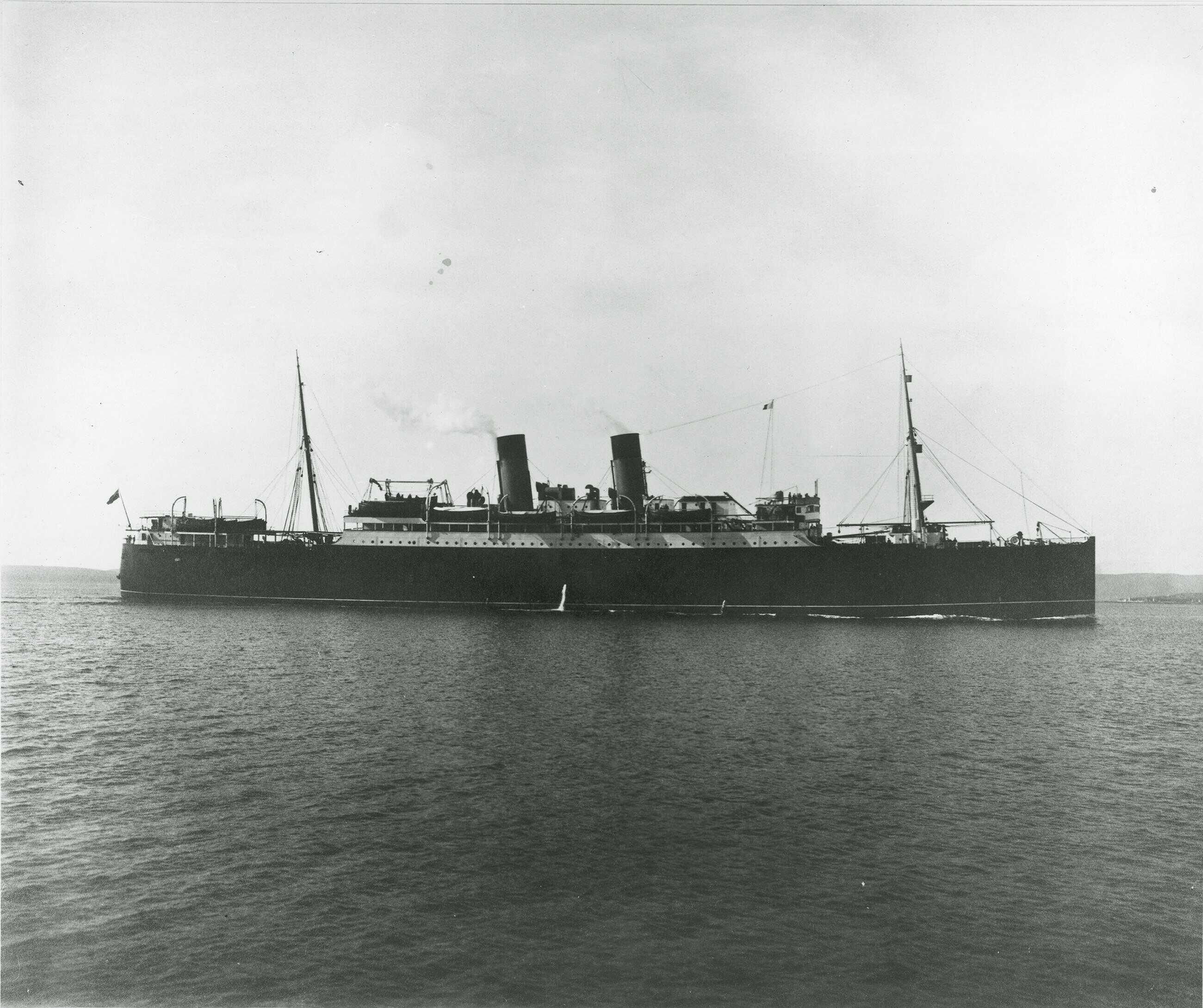
- Missanabie in October 1914.

History

United Kingdom
- Name: (Canada) (1914-1917) Missanabie; (United Kingdom of Great Britain and Ireland) (1917-1918) Missanabie
- Namesake: Missanabie
- Owner: Canadian Pacific Ocean Lines
- Port of registry: (Canada) Montreal; (United Kingdom of Great Britain and Ireland) Liverpool
- Route: Liverpool - Quebec - Montreal
- Ordered: 12 December 1912
- Builder: Barclay, Curle & Co., Ltd.
- Yard number: 510
- Launched: 22 June 1914
- Completed: 28 September 1914
- Acquired: 30 September 1914
- Maiden voyage: 7 October 1914
- In service: 7 October 1914
- Out of service: 9 September 1918
- Identification: Official number: 136705; Call sign: JGVB
- Fate: Torpedoed and sunk on 9 September 1918

General characteristics
- Type: Ocean liner
- Tonnage: 12,469 GRT
- Length: 152.6 m (500 ft 8 in)
- Beam: 19.6 m (64 ft 4 in)
- Depth: 11.6 m (38 ft 1 in)
- Decks: 7
- Installed power: Two quadruple expansion engines
- Propulsion: Double screw propellers
- Speed: 16 knots (30 km/h; 18 mph)
- Capacity: Accommodation for 1,720 passengers (520 in Second class & 1,200 in Steerage)
- Crew: 300
- Notes: Two masts and two funnels

SS Missanabie was a British/Canadian transatlantic ocean liner that was torpedoed and sunk on 9 September 1918 by the German submarine SM UB-87 in the Irish Sea 83 kilometres (52 mi) south west of Daunts Rock, Ireland at 51°11′N 7°25′W, while she was travelling from Liverpool, United Kingdom to New York, United States resulting in the loss of 45 lives.

== Construction ==
Missanabie was built at the Barclay, Curle & Co., Ltd. shipyard in Glasgow, United Kingdom. She was christened by Mrs. G. MacLaren Brown (the wife of CPR's European Manager) and launched on 22 June 1914 before being completed on 28 September 1914. The ship was 152.6 metres (500 ft 8 in) long, with a beam of 19.6 metres (64 ft 4 in) and a depth of 11.6 metres (38 ft 1 in). The ship was assessed at 12,469 gross register tons (GRT). She had two quadruple expansion engines rated at 725 nominal horsepower, driving two four-bladed screws which allowed her to achieve a maximum speed of 16 knots (30 km/h; 18 mph). The ship had eight coal-fired boilers which were designed for easy conversion to oil fuel, if necessary, alongside two funnels and two masts. As built, the ship could carry 1,720 passengers including 520 in Second class and 1,200 in steerage. Missanabie's forward plating was strengthened in order to navigate safely through loose ice and growlers that the ship would seasonally encounter in the St. Lawrence River. The ship was also equipped with a double bottom and was divided into ten watertight compartments which could keep her afloat with any three compartments flooded. There were 18 lifeboats installed on the ship alongside Babcock & Wilcox Ltd. davits. Missanabie was designed to carry 8,770 tons of cargo spread over seven holds, of which four were located forward and three aft, amounting to 400,000 cubic feet (11,327 m^{3}). Missanabie had one sister ship, Metagama.

== Accommodations and interior ==
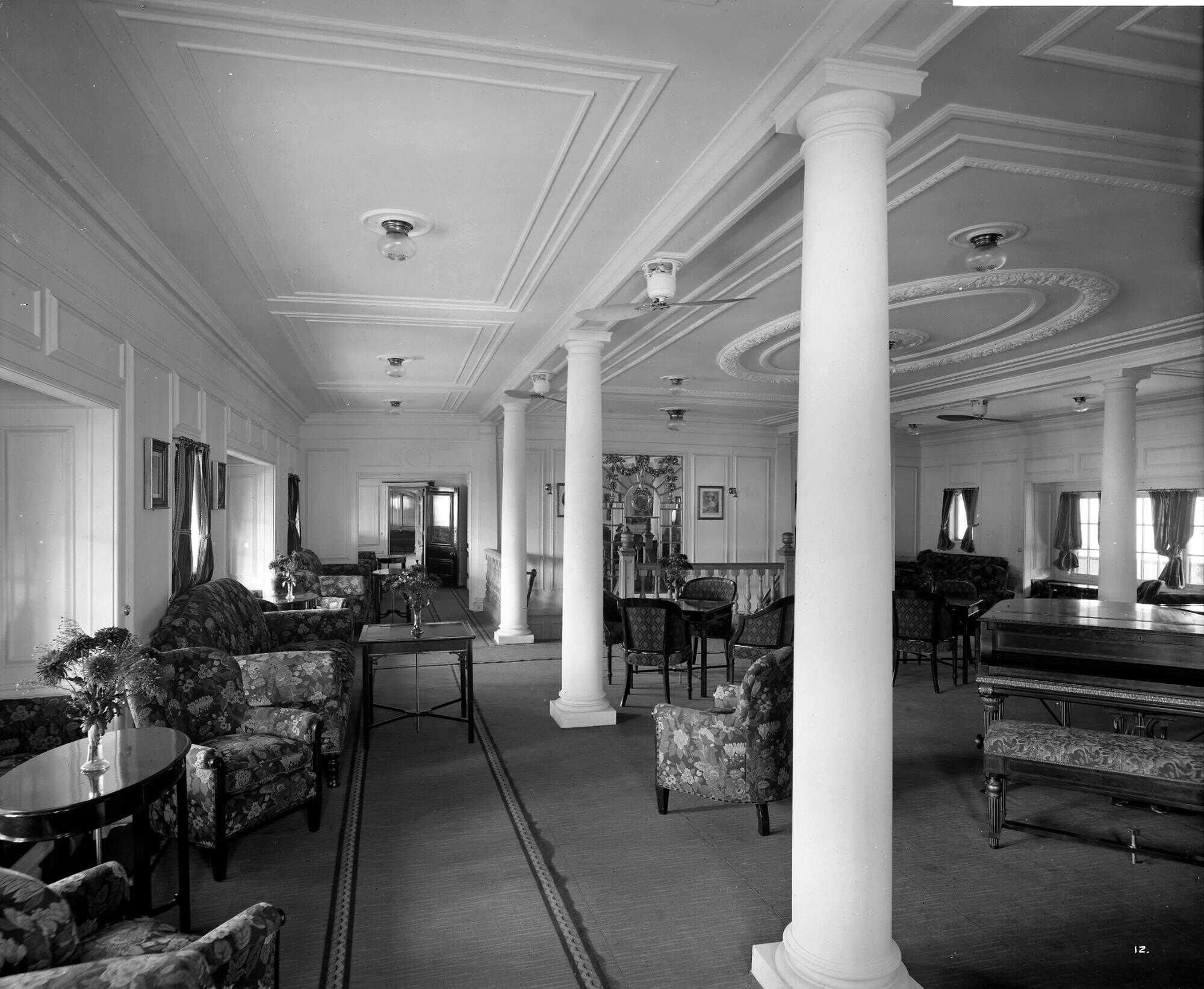
Cabin class lounge

Second (Cabin) class had several luxuries installed on the ship, such as the gymnasium which was located amidships in its own deckhouse between the ship's funnels. Other Cabin class public rooms were located on the upper promenade deck, where the lounge was housed in the main deck house which opened directly to the top of the main staircase and was equipped with bay windows. The deck above the lounge, where the wireless office was located forward of the first funnel, was raised to make the room look more spacious. The lounge was also painted white, as to contrast the oak paneling that was used on the nearby staircase and was fully carpeted. Aft of the lounge, behind the forward funnel casing, a wide passageway was arranged into seating areas which included sofas and two writing alcoves with bay windows that looked out onto the open starboard promenade deck. Cabin class could also enjoy the drawing room which was installed with a marble encased electric fireplace, plastered ceilings, wood paneling and full carpeting. Other areas for Cabin class passengers included, a smoking room located aft and decorated with plaster and timber, a card room located on the starboard side which mainly consisted of a series of alcoves with bay windows and a half-enclosed veranda café that offered views overlooking the stern area. The ship's aft staircase had wood paneling and balustrades alongside a skylight and rubber decking. The Cabin class dining saloon was situated just forward of amidships on upper deck and had seating arrangements for 272 passengers alongside an open well that extended through the shelter deck in the centre of the saloon and larger portholes. Cabin class cabins, which could house 520 passengers and held two or four berths, were located on the starboard and aft lower promenade- and shelter deck. Each cabin included a wardrobe, drawer, folding lavatory with mirror and other conveniences.

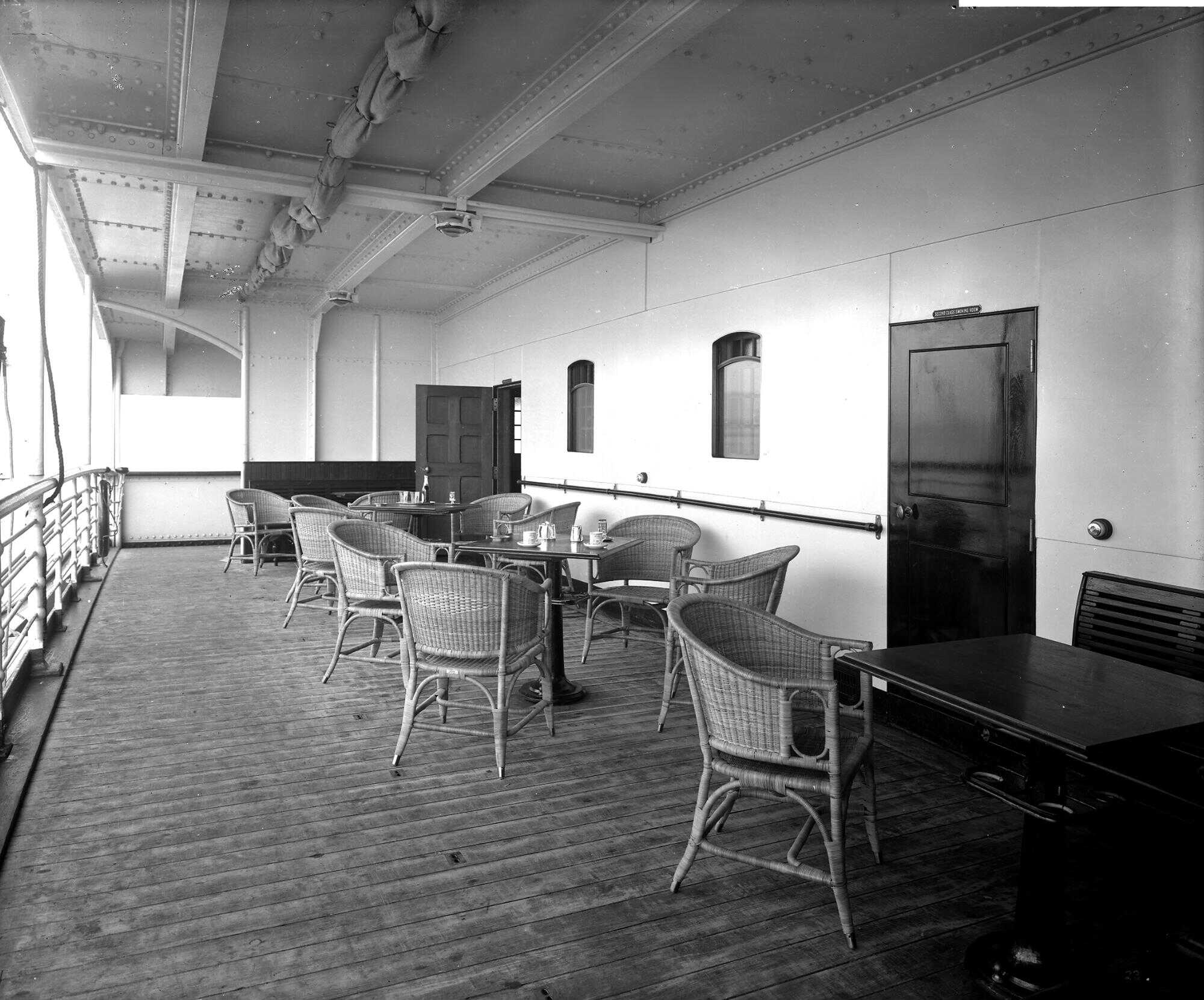
Cabin class Veranda Café

Steerage class could enjoy the open aft well deck space alongside public rooms such as the aft smoking room, ladies lounge which housed a piano and a large common room in the bow. The Third class dining rooms were situated aft of the galley that separated it from the Cabin class dining room and could seat 210 people each. There were arrangements space for 1,200 steerage passengers divided into two, four and six berthed cabins.

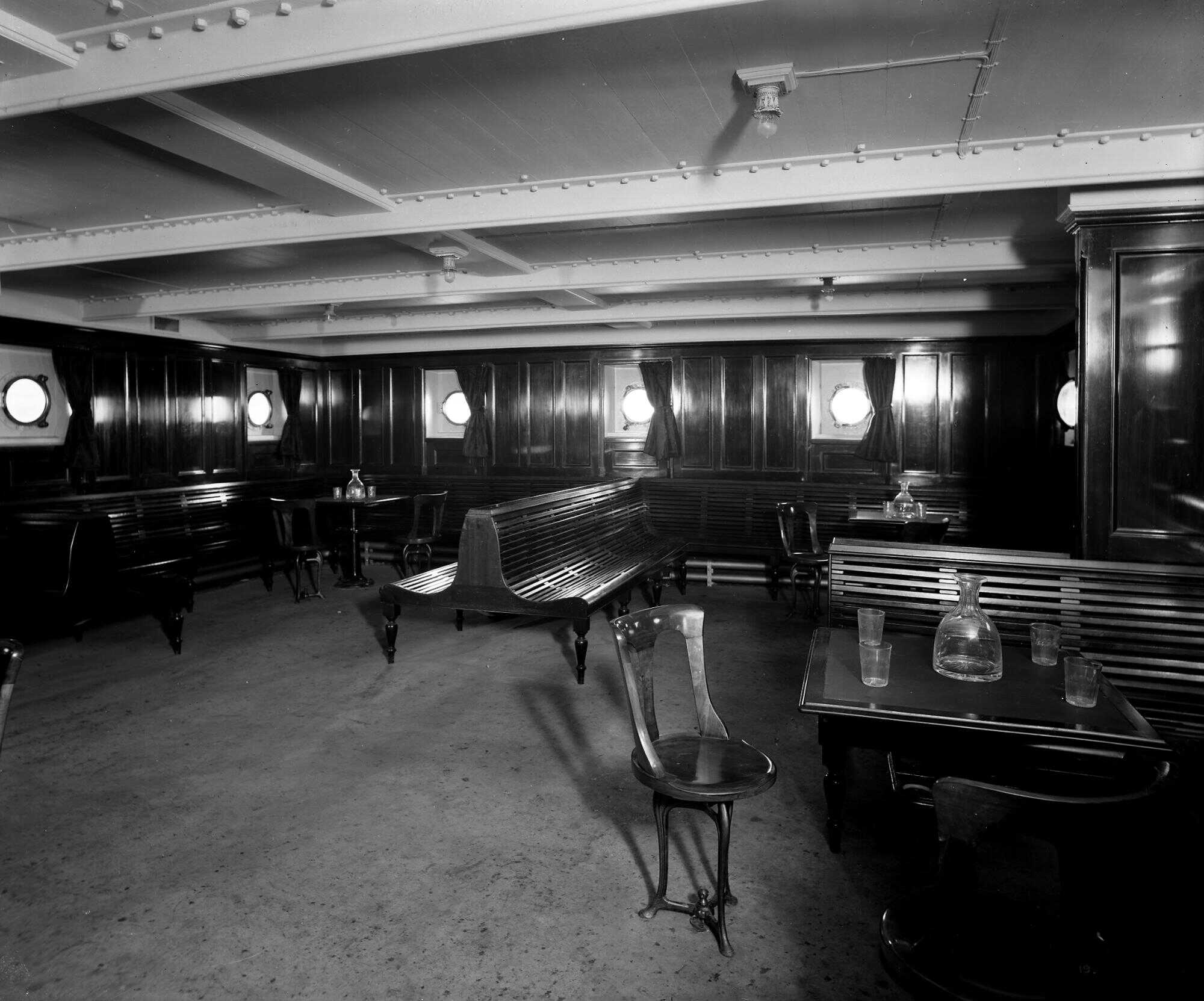
Third class Smoking Room

== Career ==
Missanabie arrived at Liverpool from the Barclay, Curle & Co., Ltd. shipyard in Glasgow on 30 September 1914 and returned to Scotland to successfully complete her sea trials on the River Clyde on 2 October before returning to Liverpool in time for her maiden voyage. The ship departed on her maiden voyage from Liverpool to Montreal via Quebec on 7 October under the command of Captain G. B. Evans and carrying 466 Cabin and 462 Third Class passengers. The ship had to raise two flags, signifying the password of the day, in order to be allowed to sail into the port of Quebec on 15 October due to the ongoing war and reached Montreal in the afternoon the following day before departing on her first eastbound crossing on 22 October. Missanabie would complete four crossings during the rest of the year, carrying a total of 4,896 passengers including 1,883 westbound and 3,073 eastbound.

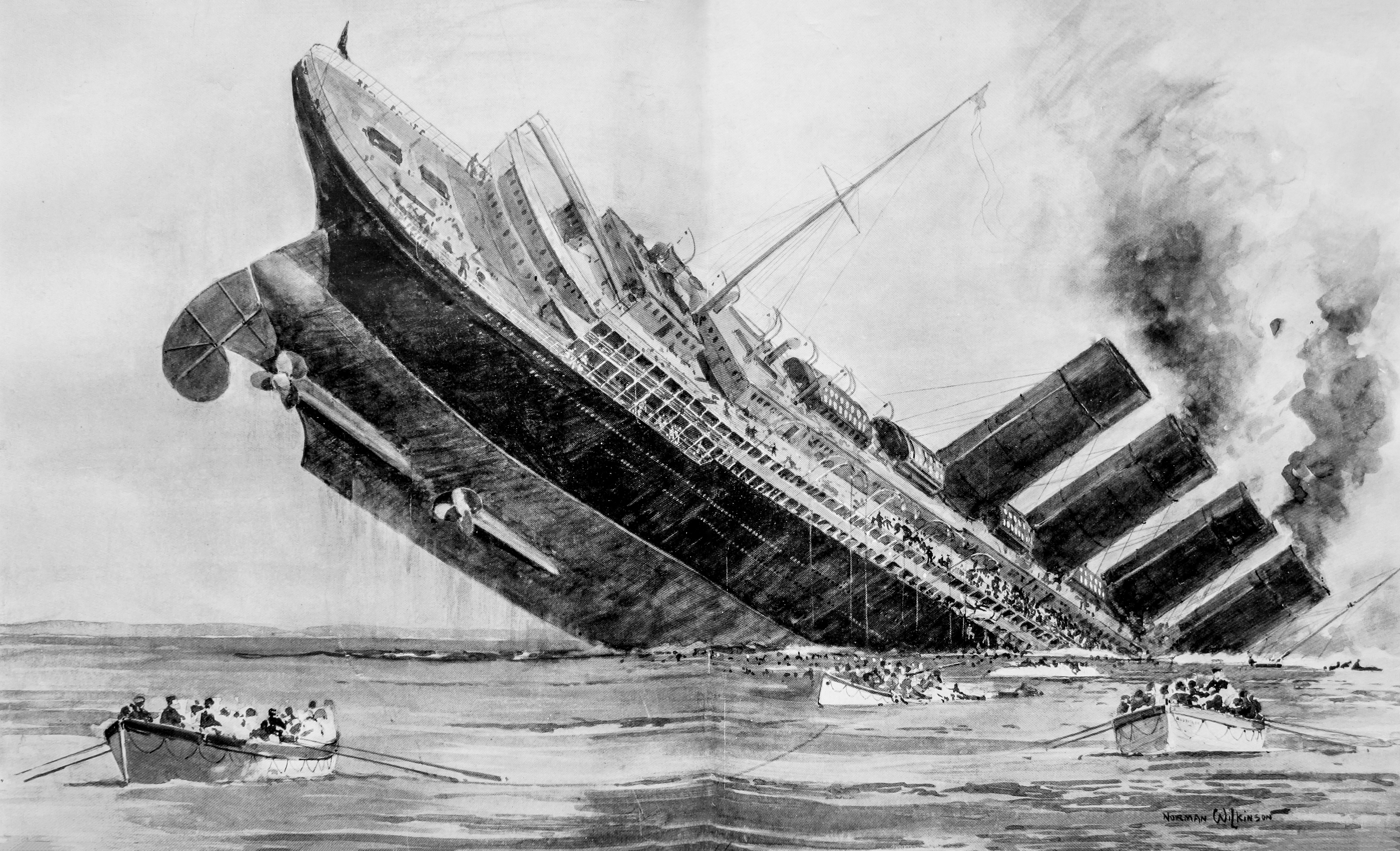
Sinking of RMS Lusitania on 7 May 1915

Beginning in February 1915, Missanabie would transport Canadian troops to the Western Front in Europe in secrecy, departing for her first of these voyages from Halifax on 23 February 1915 at 8 am. On this crossing, the ship carried the first group of Canada's Second Contingent, which included the 23rd Battalion and 35 officers alongside 1,104 soldiers of the 30th Battalion while Missanabie was escorted by HMS Essex and HMS Glory. The ship arrived safely at Avonmouth on 6 March, after which she was returned to commercial service. Missanabie would once again be commandeered by the British Admiralty on 6 May, cancelling the ship's eastbound civilian voyage for 20 May, but still allowing her to complete her westbound commercial voyage for which she departed Liverpool on 7 May 1915 at 4 pm. As Missanabie was sailing off the Old Head of Kinsale at 2.30 pm on 8 May 1915, wreckage was spotted by her passengers and crew which was identified of belonging to the Cunard Line ocean liner RMS Lusitania which was torpedoed and sunk by the German submarine U-20 the previous day with a great loss of life. Passengers reported seeing upturned or swamped lifeboats which bore Lusitania's name alongside eight empty lifeboats, pieces of wreckage such as timber planks and bodies of the victims some with and some without lifebelts on. Missanabie steamed through the wrecksite at high speed and with a report that there was still submarine activity in the vicinity, Missanabie's captain decided to preemptively swing out all 18 lifeboats while maintaining a zig-zag course at high speed until the ship steered clear of the danger zone. Missanabie safely reached Quebec on 17 May 1915 and Montreal the following day. On her westbound trip from Liverpool on 11 June 1915, Missanabie carried wounded officers and soldiers back to Canada alongside her civilian occupants before departing eastbound again on 24 June with another 1,043 troops aboard from the 38th, 39th and 47th Battalion alongside the Royal Canadian Dental Corps. Missanabie repatriated the body of 15-year-old Lusitania victim Gwendolyn Allan and arrived at Montreal on 26 July 1915 at 1 pm with her flags flying at half-mast. Other vessels in the harbour paid tribute to the late Miss Allan by also lowering their flags. Missanabie carried a total of 9,840 passengers and 11,712 military personnel spanned over 22 crossings during 1915.

During 1916, Missanabie switched between commercial and military service and managed to complete 20 crossings which carried 9,226 passengers and 8,506 military personnel between Canada and Europe. Following the declaration of unrestricted submarine warfare by Imperial Germany on 1 February 1917, Missanabie continued making eastbound military crossings and westbound civilian crossings under a silent service, which meant that her departure dates were no longer published in the newspapers. Following the United States' entry into the war, Missanabie took on 38 officers and 1,116 men of the U.S. 102nd Infantry Regiment at Montreal on 20 September 1917 and managed to safely land them at Liverpool. Missanabie completed 18 crossings during 1917, carrying a total of 1,137 passengers and 11,712 military personnel. By September 1918, Missanabie was painted in dazzle camouflage to deter enemy submarine attacks and had completed 10 crossings which included six to New York, carrying a total of 1,732 passengers.

== Loss ==
Missanabie departed Liverpool on 8 September 1918 at 11.30 am under the command of Captain G. B. Evans as part of convoy OL34 with 200 crew and 59 troops alongside a number of civilian passengers aboard. The following day, as the convoy was sailing in heavy seas at 11.5 knots (21.3 km/h; 13.2 mph), 83 kilometres (52 mi) south west of Daunts Rock, Ireland in the Irish Sea, Missanabie was struck by two torpedoes by the German submarine UB-87 at 12.32 am as she was sailing as the last ship in line of the convoy due to engine trouble. Both torpedoes struck Missanabie on her starboard side, with the first striking the engine room and the second further aft. Lookouts on the escort ship USS McCall had seen the torpedo wake of the submarine and proceeded to steer towards the scene, dropping 11 depth charges but failing to hit the German submarine. In the meantime seven lifeboats from Missanabie's port side were being loaded and launched, but two of the lifeboats capsized as they reached the heavy seas, while the lifeboats on the starboard side could not be launched due to the ship's list. Only four minutes after the attack, the ship's stern began to settle in the water, prompting several men aboard including a group of U.S. Marines to jump overboard and swim for the lifeboats. Missanabie sank stern first, letting her bow rise vertically in the air before the ship disappeared below the waves seven minutes after the first torpedo hit. USS McCall circled the wrecksite and lowered a whaleboat into the water in order to recover the men that had not made it into Missanabie's lifeboats, and rescued seven to nine survivors over the next two hours. The survivors in the lifeboats were also recovered by USS McCall and landed at Milford Haven, Wales on 10 September. A total of 45 lives were lost during the sinking, including 38 crew and 7 troops.

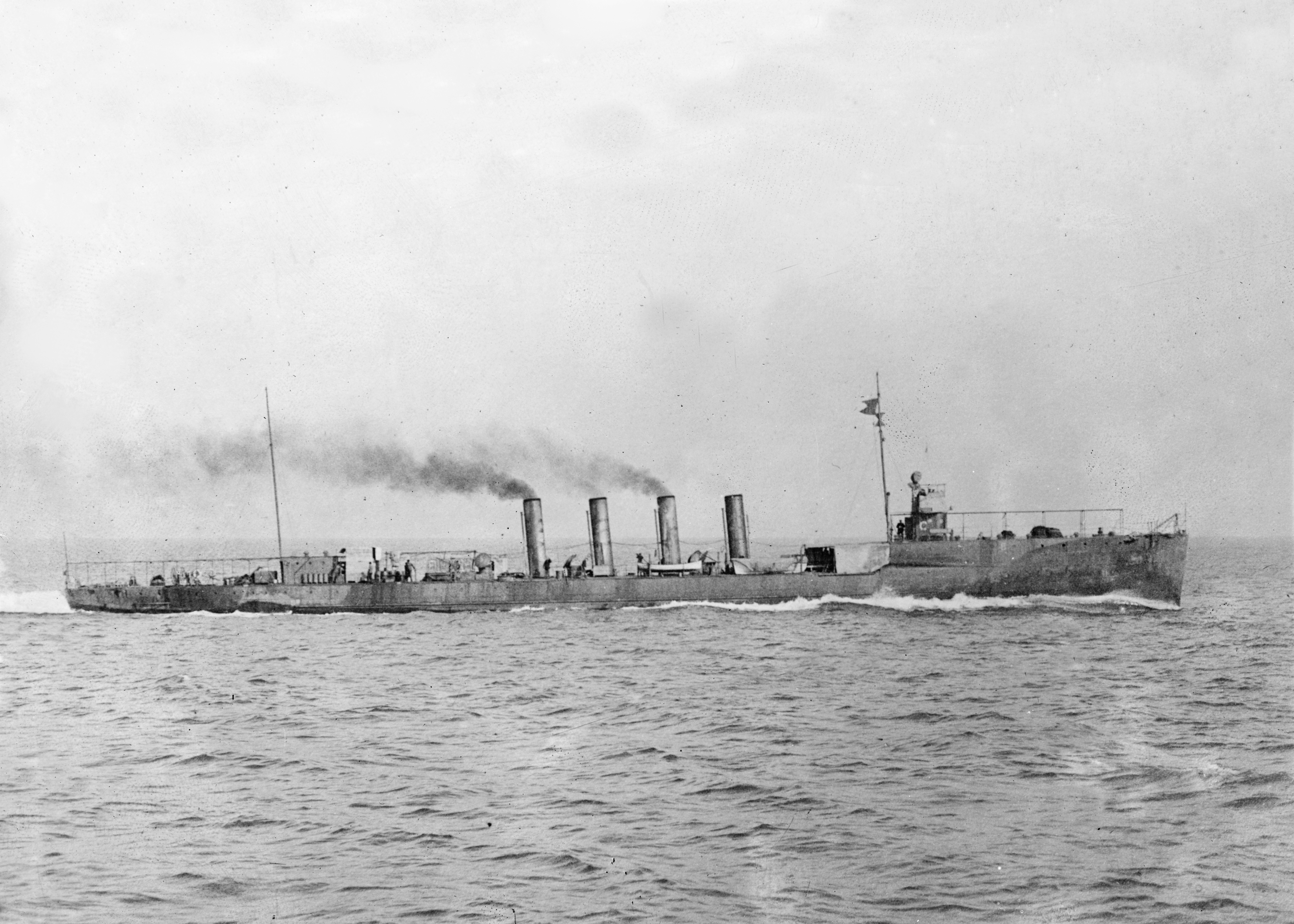
USS McCall in 1911.

New Zealand Lieutenant A. Martin, who was aboard another ship in the convoy, drew a sketch of Missanabie's final moments, which was published in the Otago Witness on 15 January 1919. The crew of USS McCall were commended for their actions during the rescue of Missanabie's survivors by Vice Admiral William S. Sims. The two crewmen of McCall's whaleboat, Ensign R. M. Ihrig and Chief Boatswain Mate Stanley F. Roman, were awarded the Navy Cross for rescuing those struggling in the water.

== Wreck ==
The wreck of Missanabie was discovered in September 2022 and identified by her bell. The Wreck lies on its starboard side at (51°11′N 7°25′W) in 97 metres (318 ft 3 in) of water.

== Gallery ==
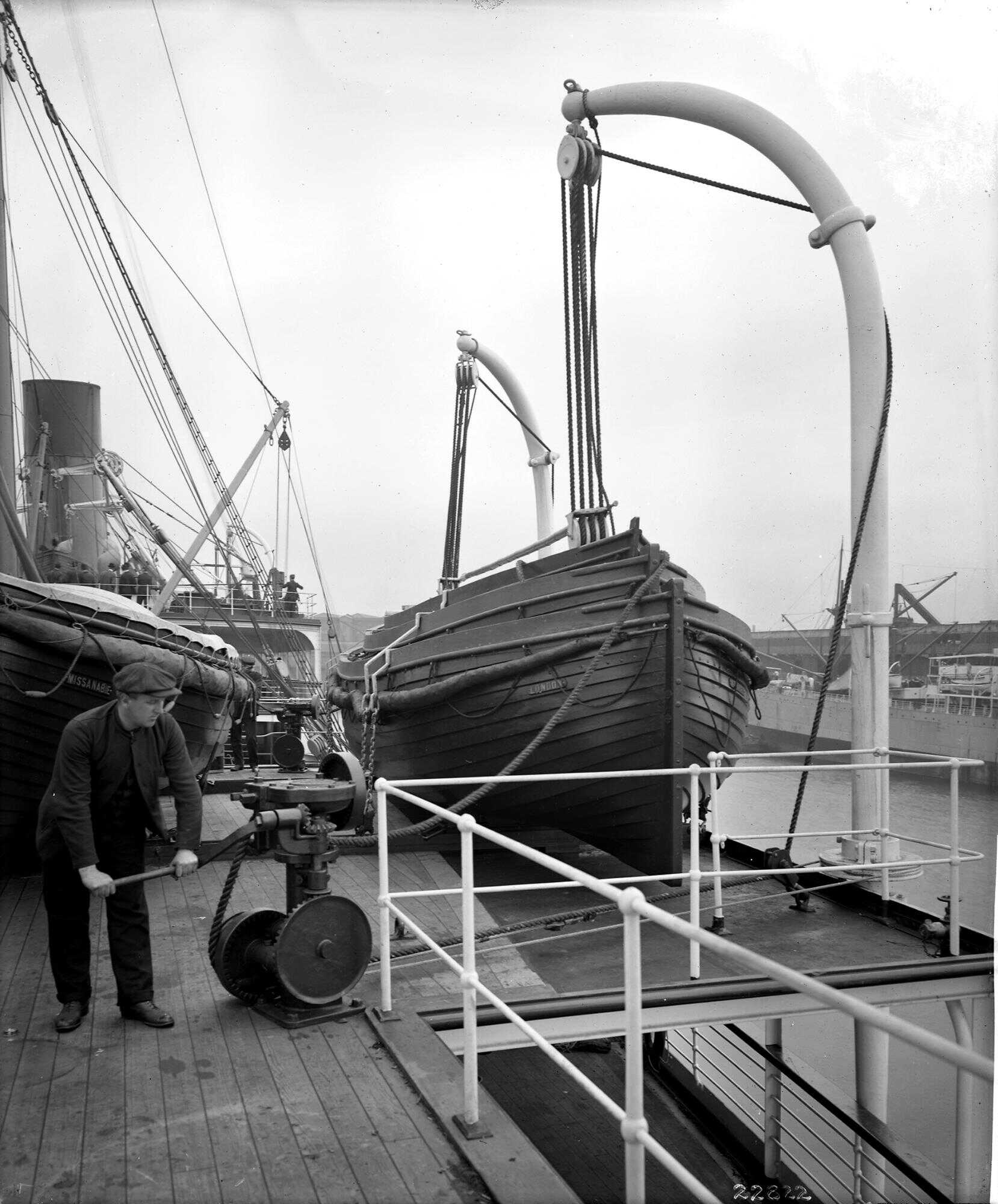
Missanabie's starboard side aft boat deck.

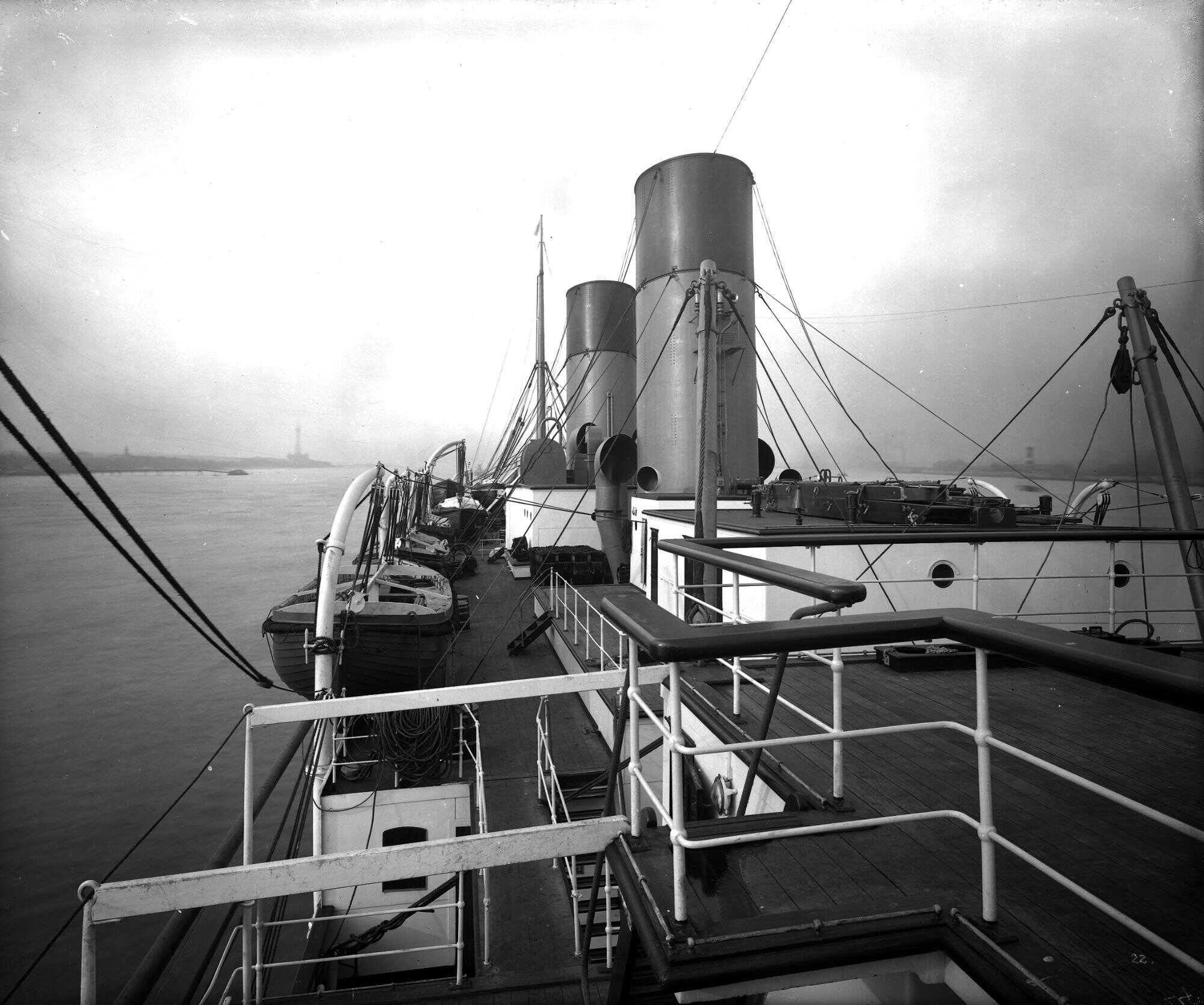
Missanabie's boat deck viewed from the flying bridge in October 1914.

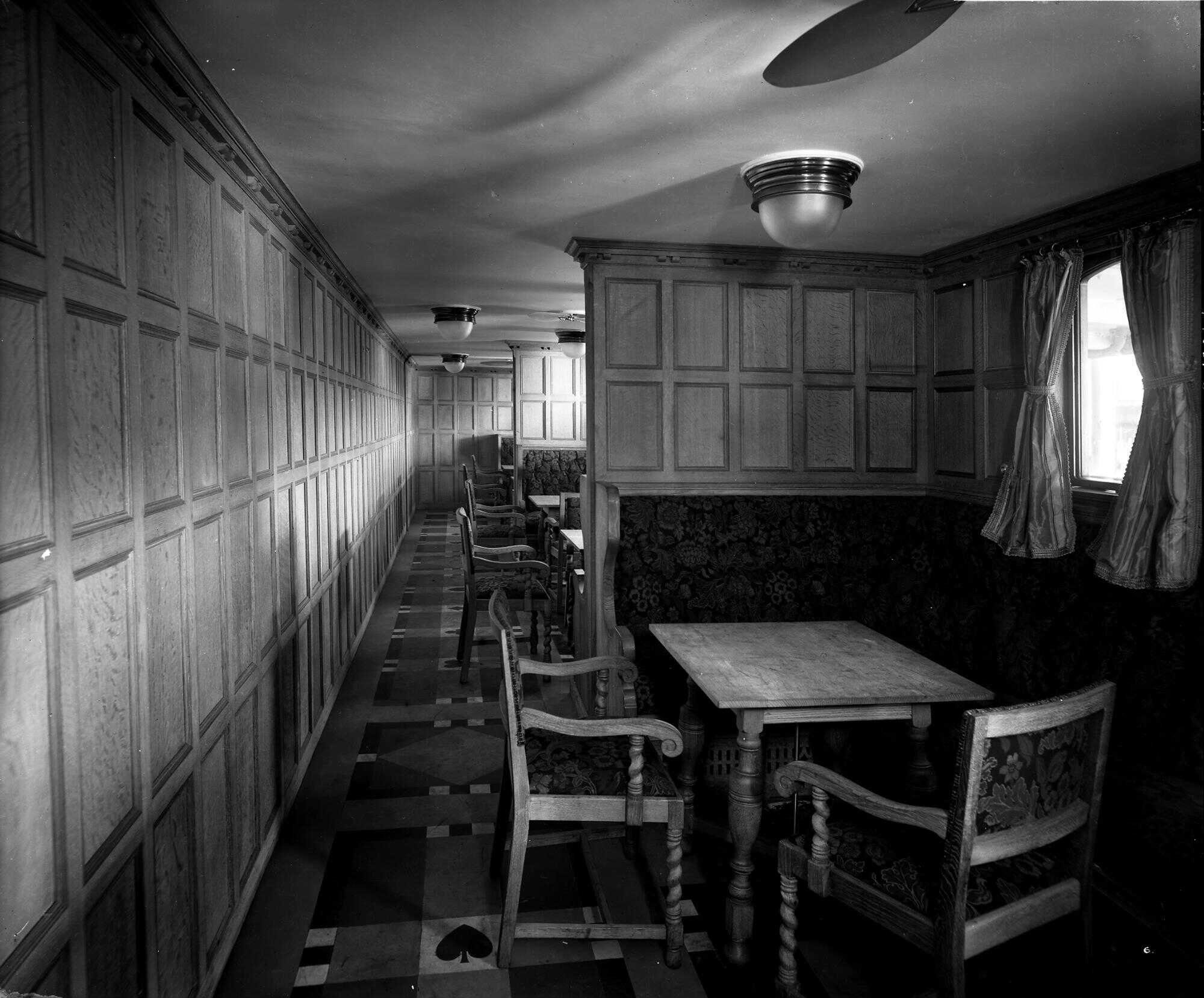
Cabin Class Card Room.

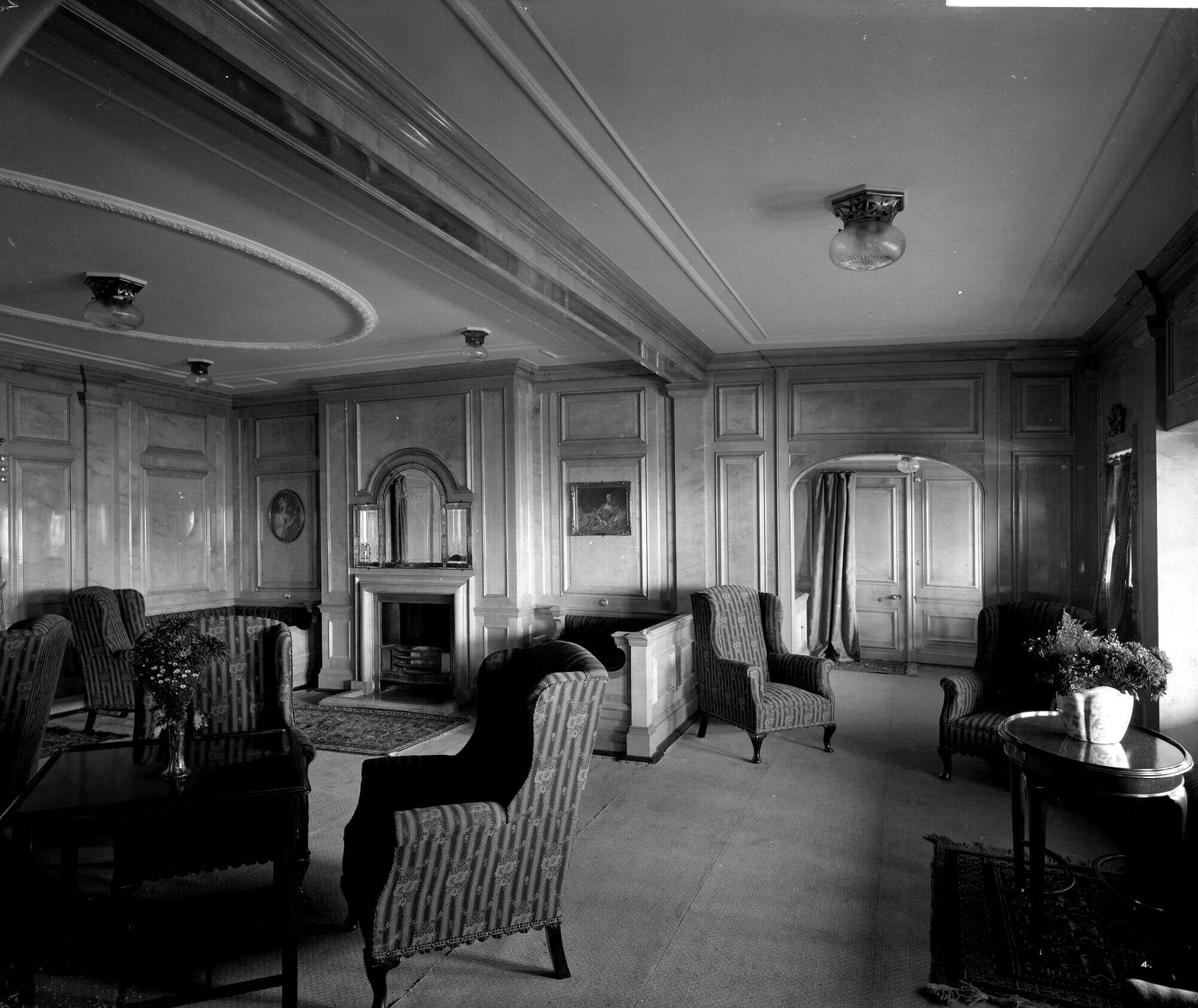
Cabin Class Drawing Room.

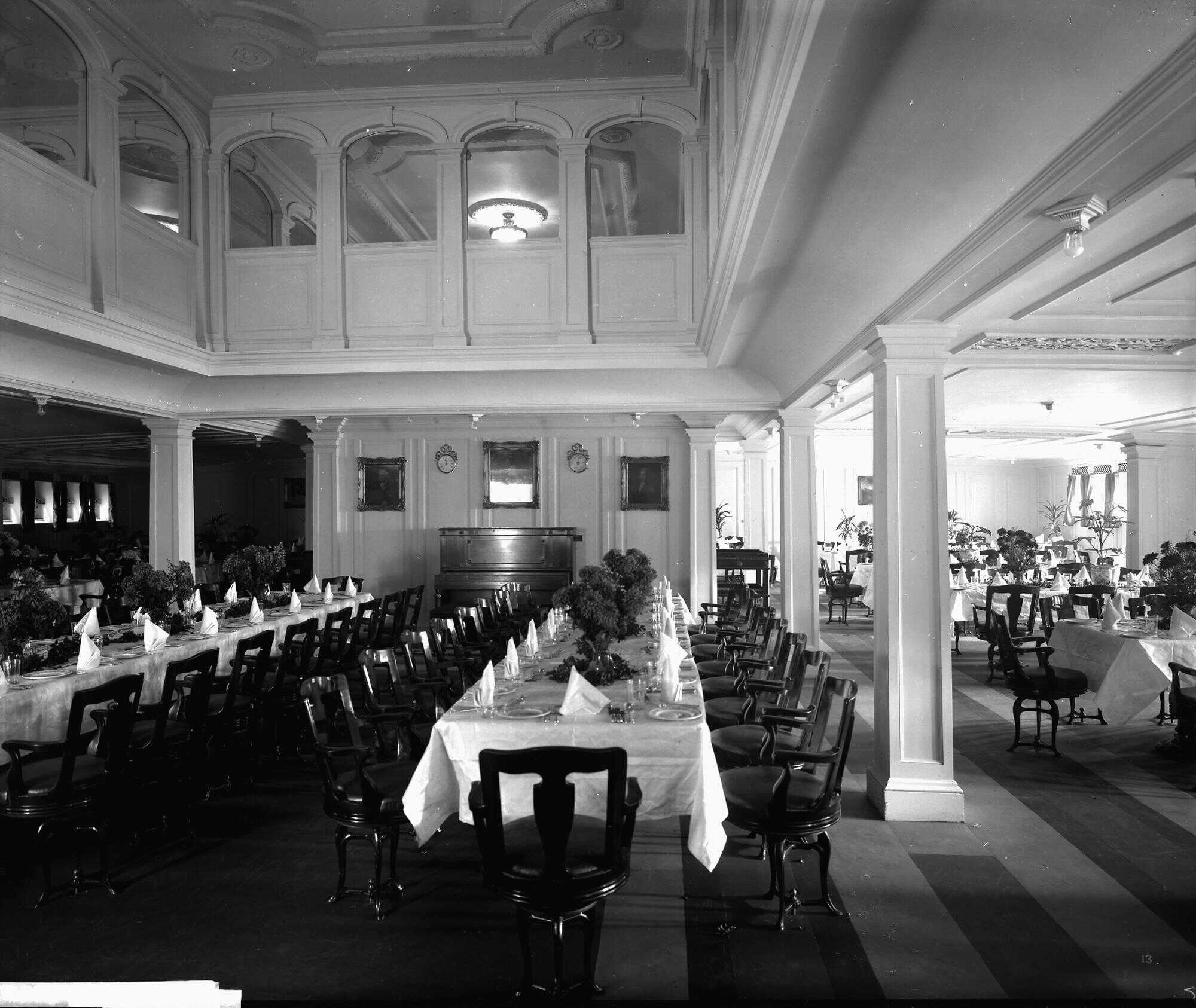
Cabin Class Dining Saloon.

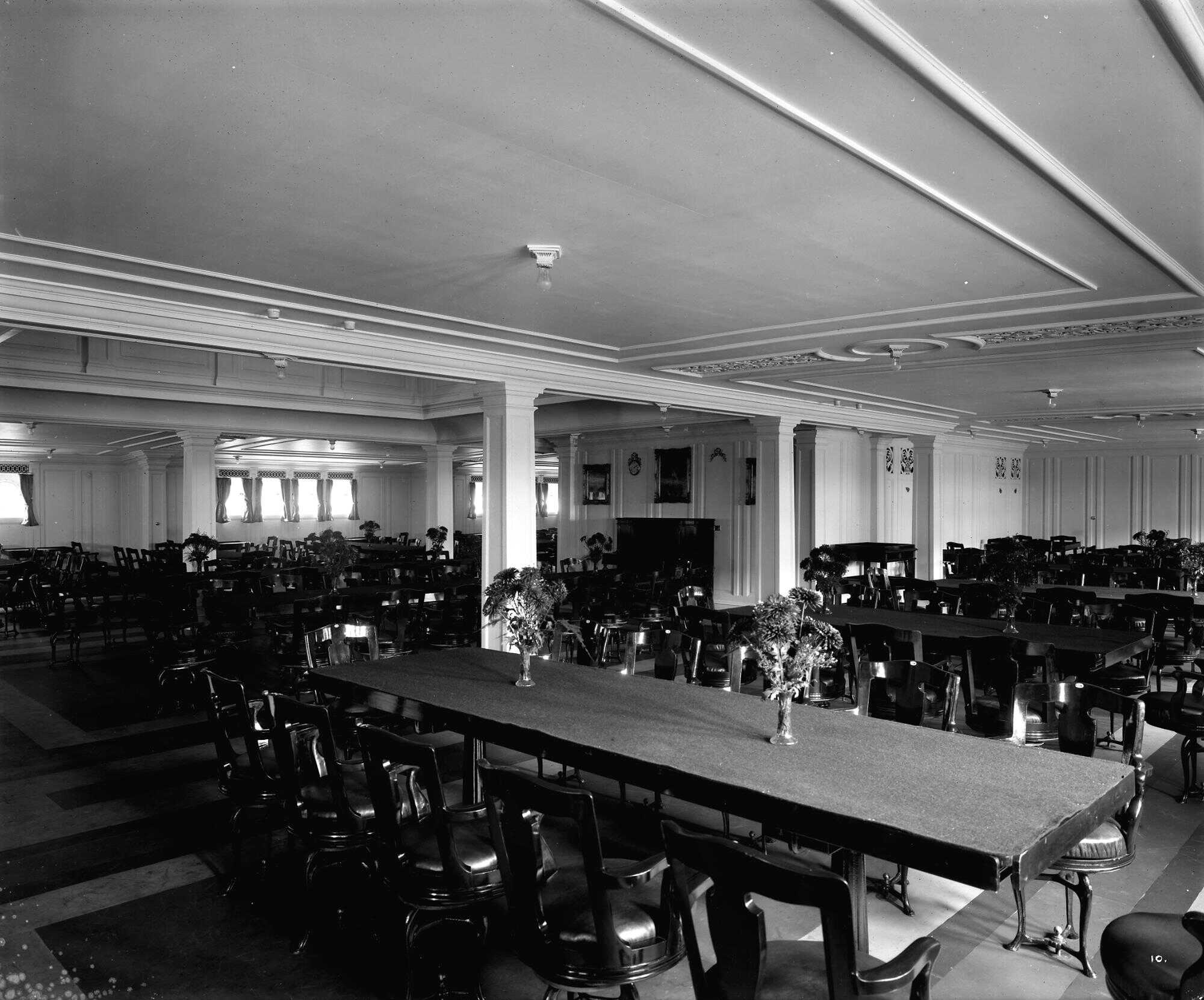
Cabin Class Dining Saloon.

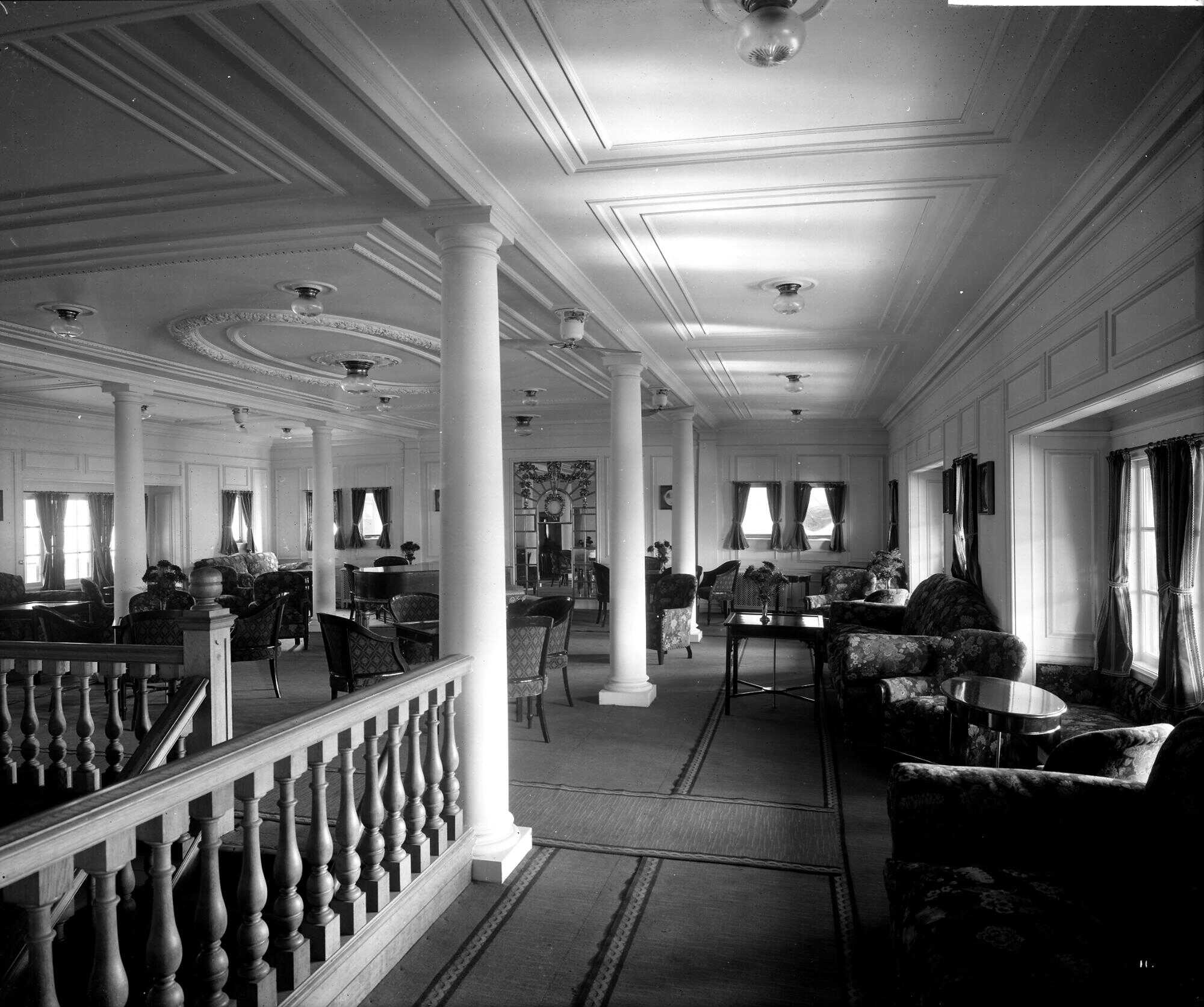
Cabin Class Lounge.

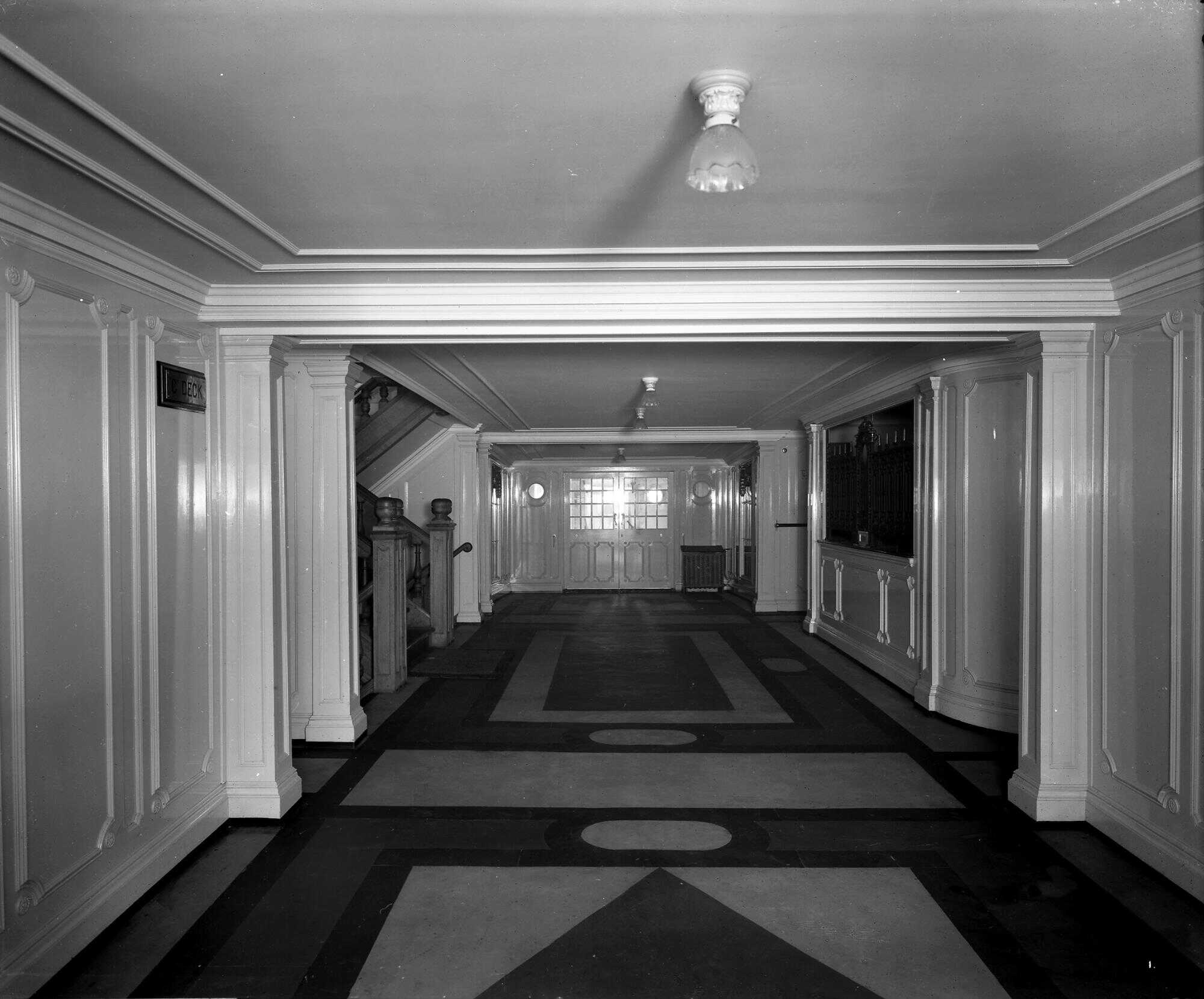
Cabin Class Entrance.

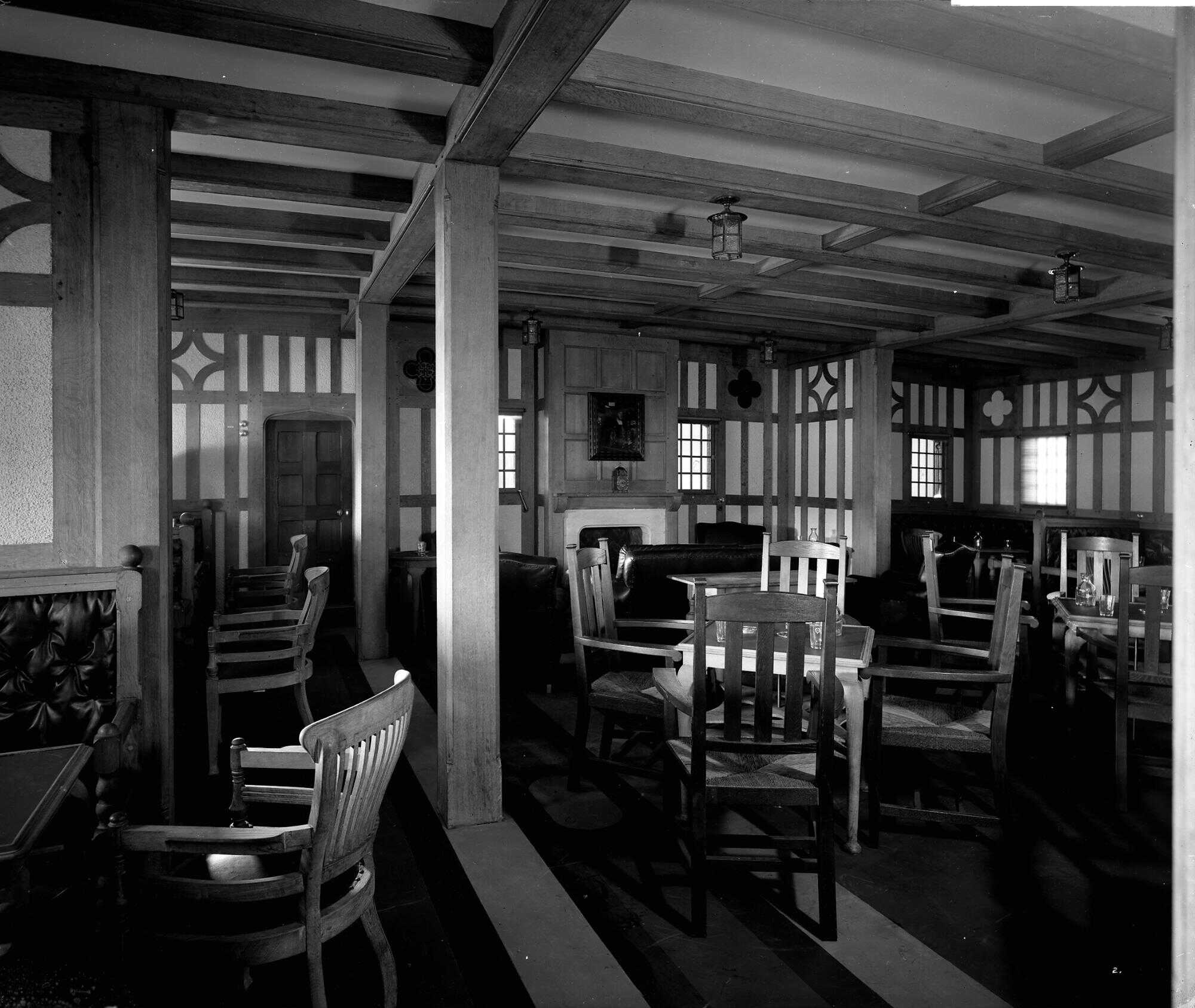
Cabin Class Smoking Room.

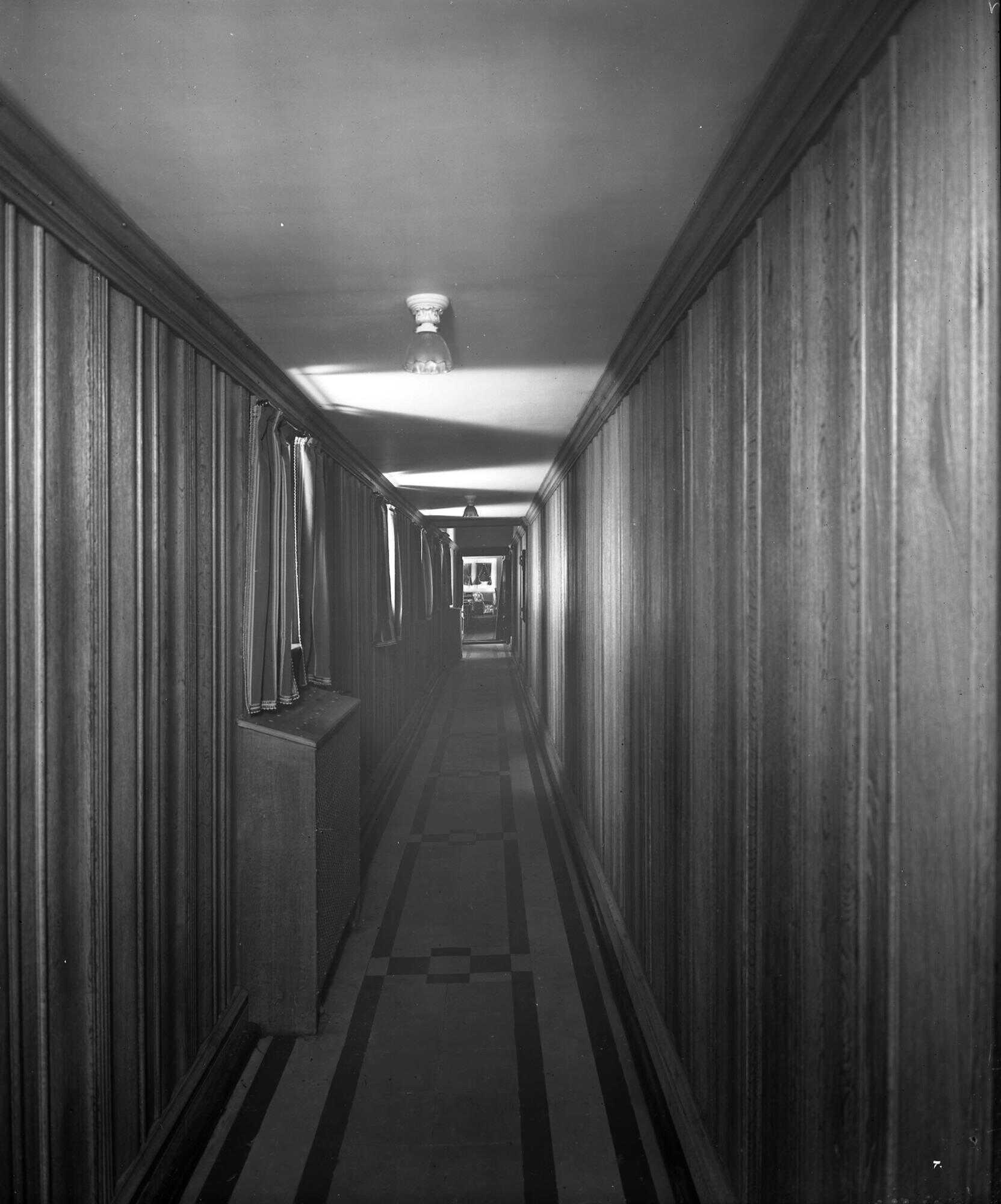
Cabin Class passage.

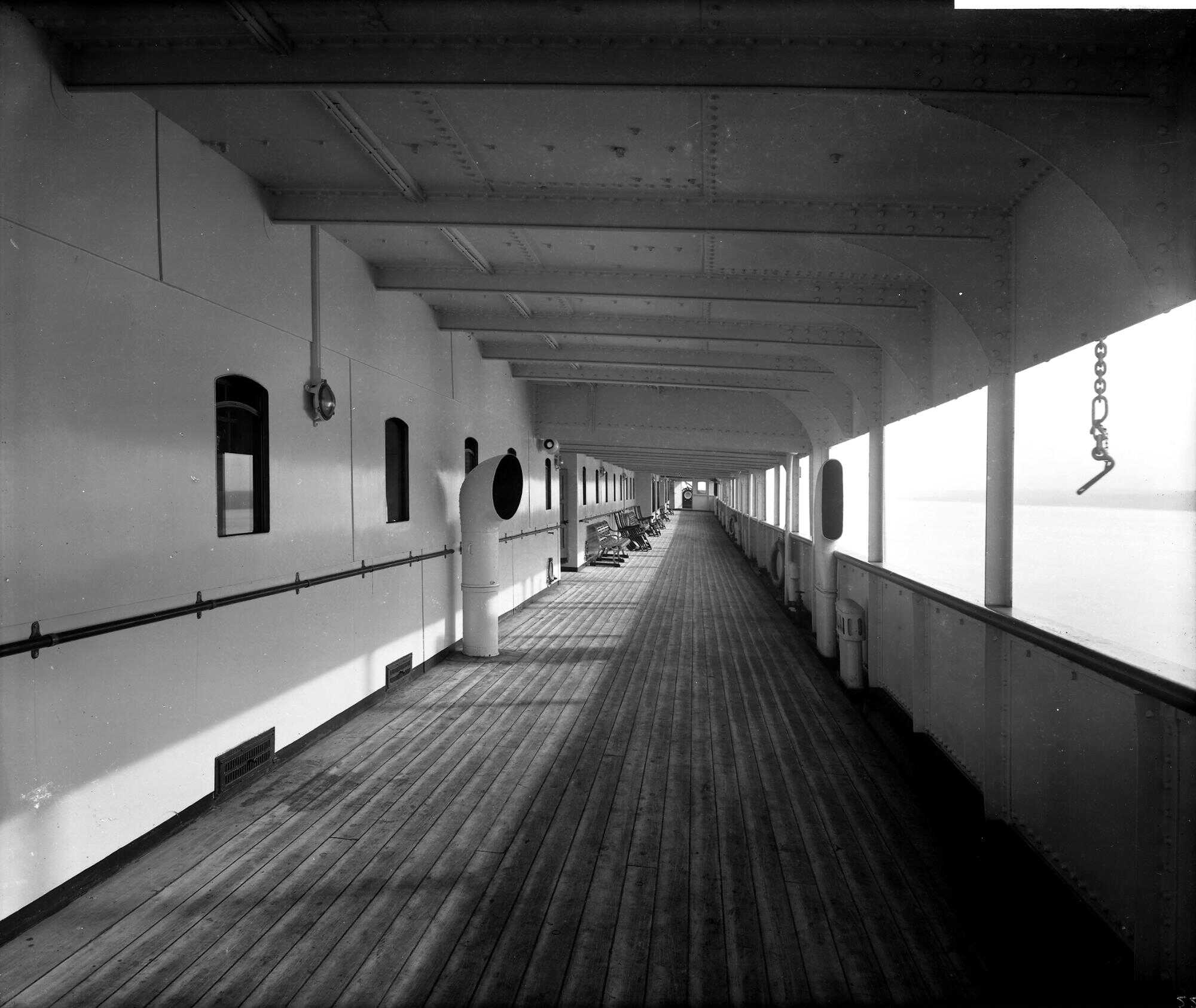
Cabin Class Promenade facing forward.

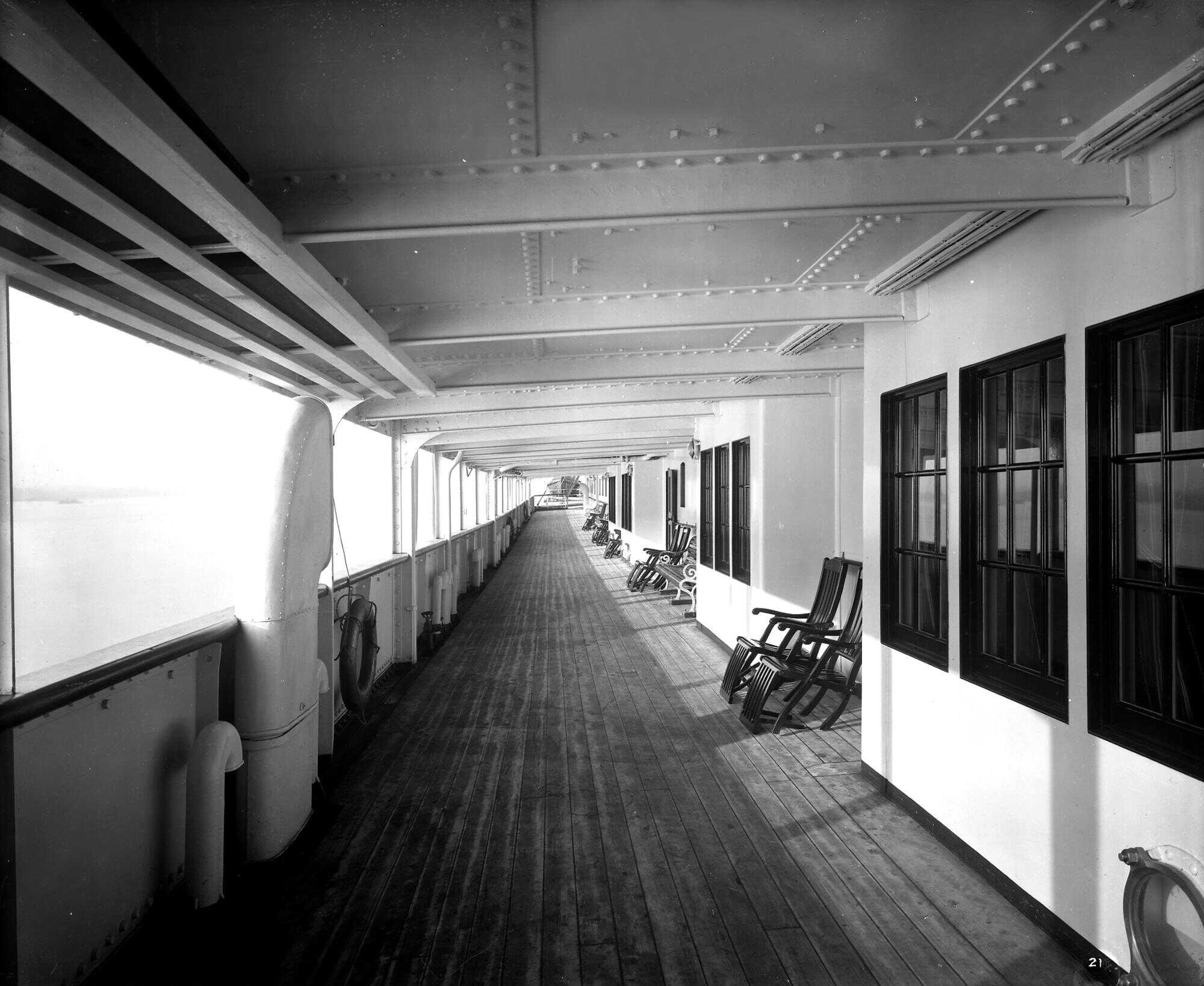
Cabin Class Promenade facing aft.

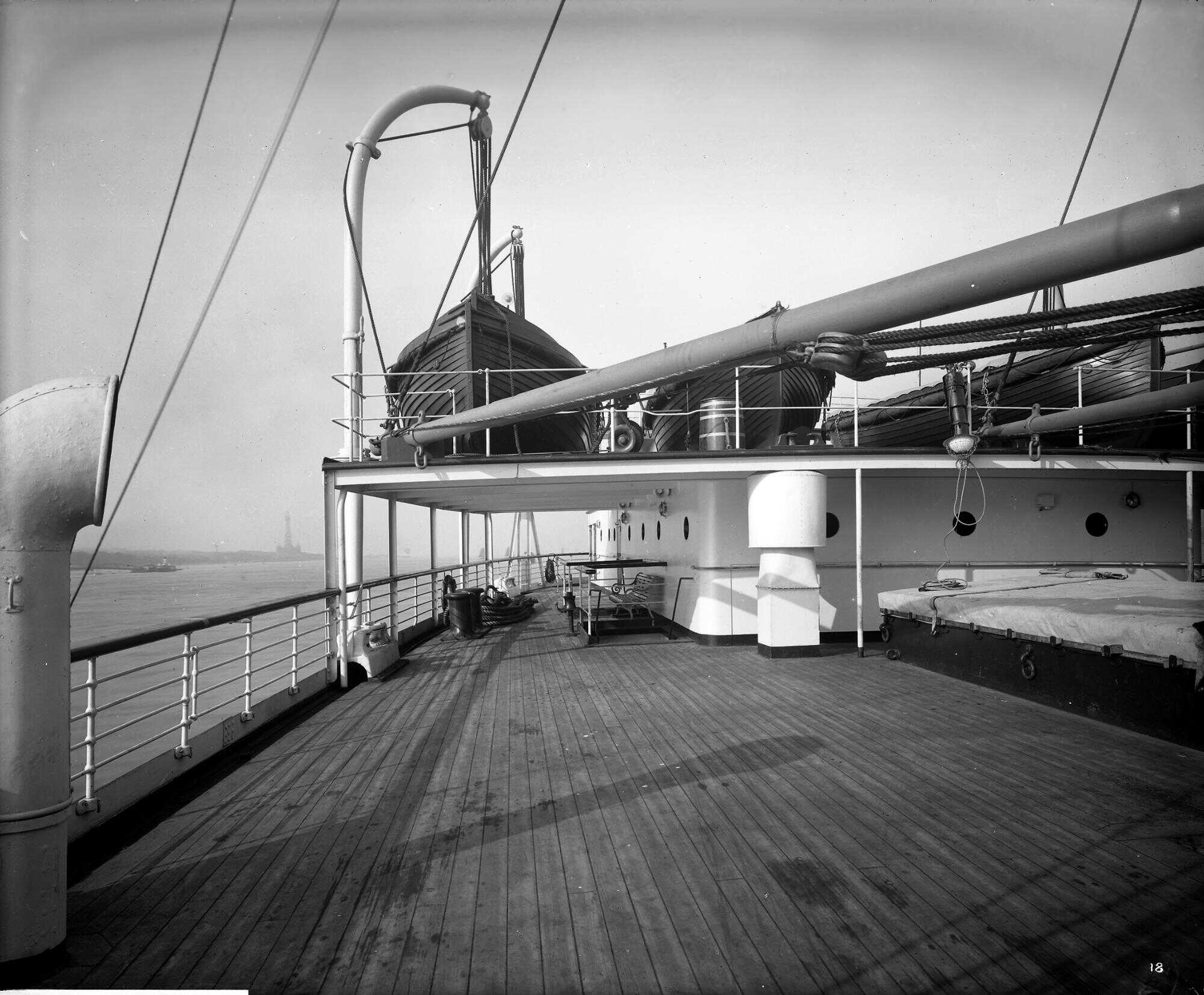
Third Class Promenade.

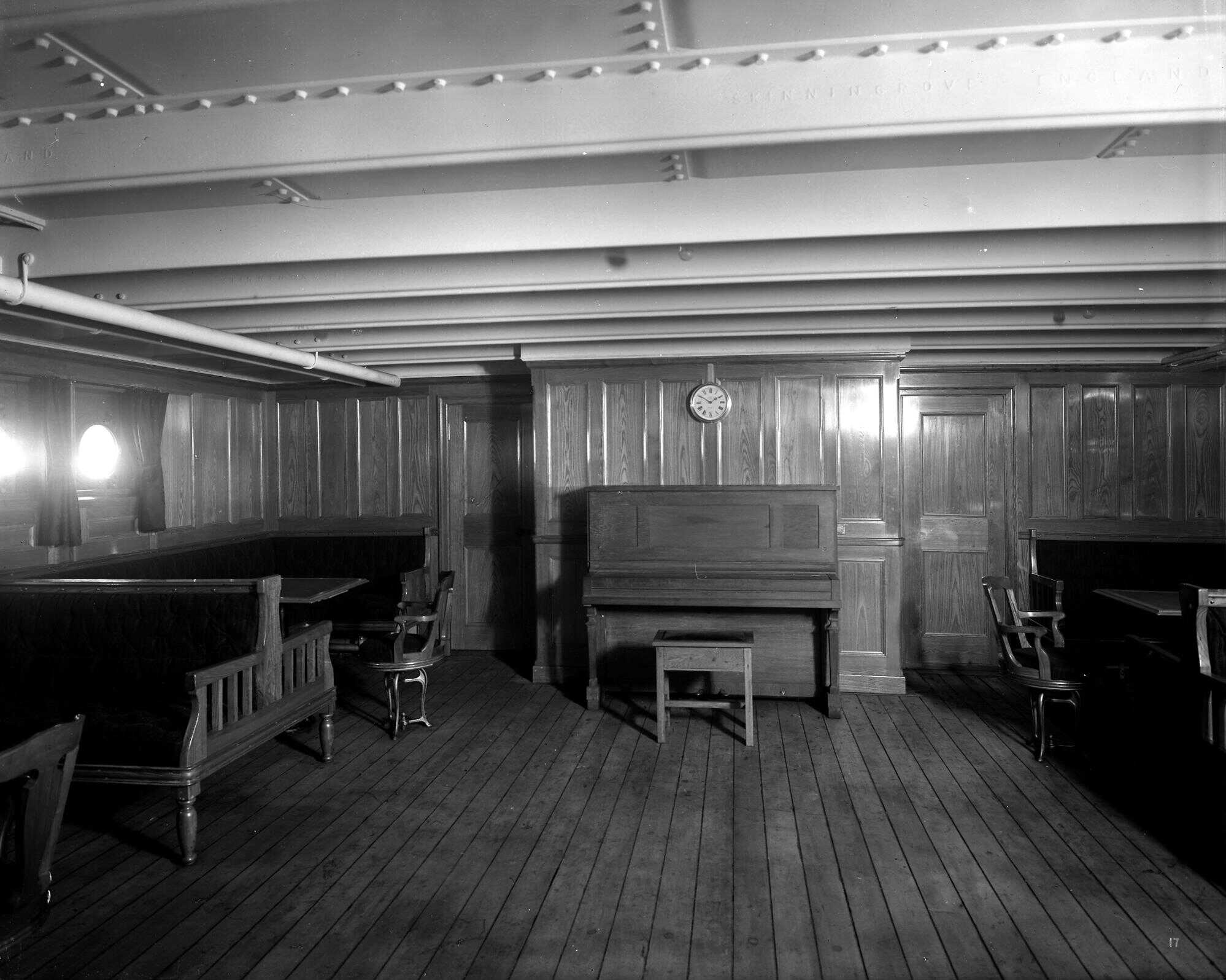
Third Class Ladies' Room.

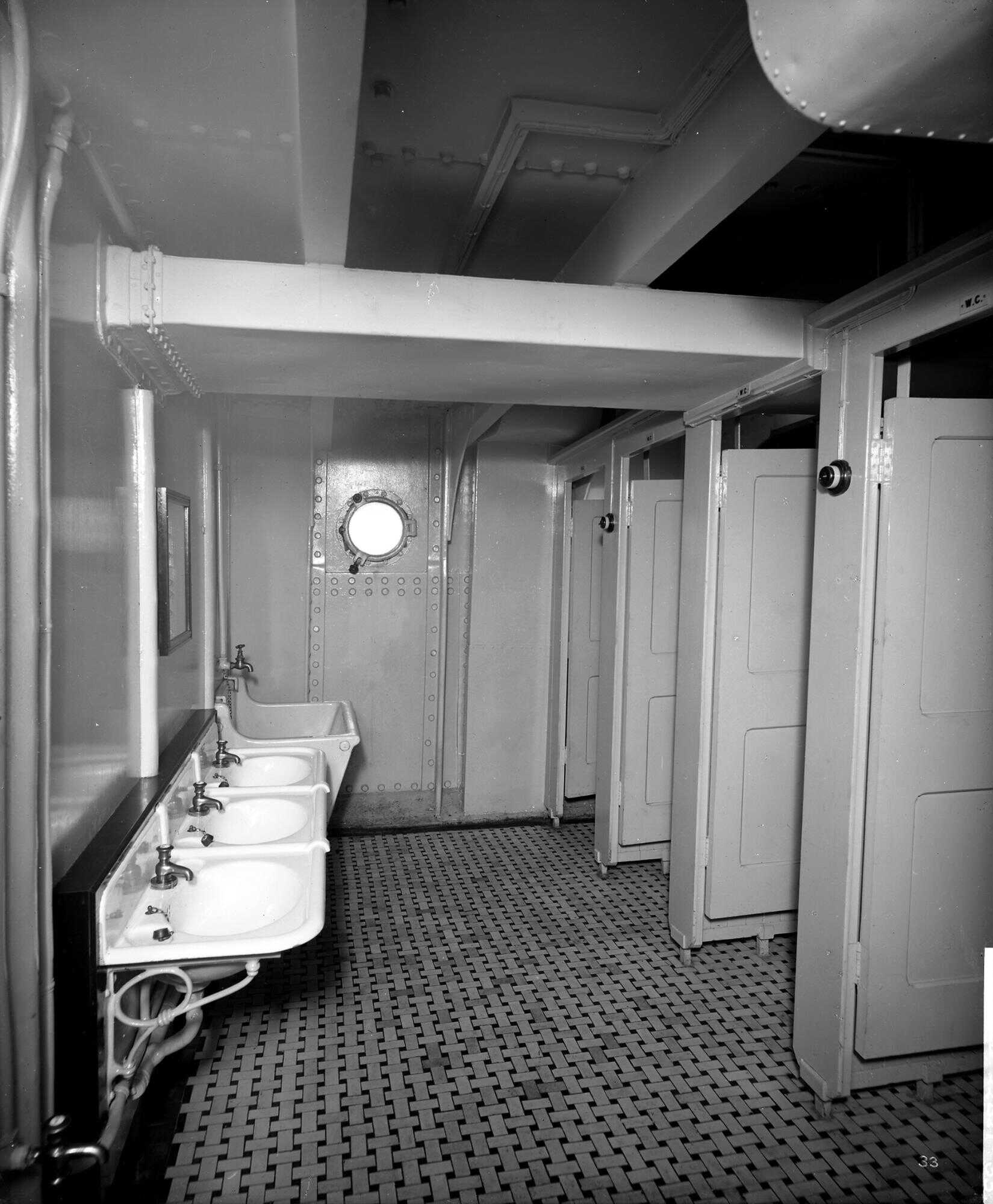
Third Class Ladies' Lavatory.

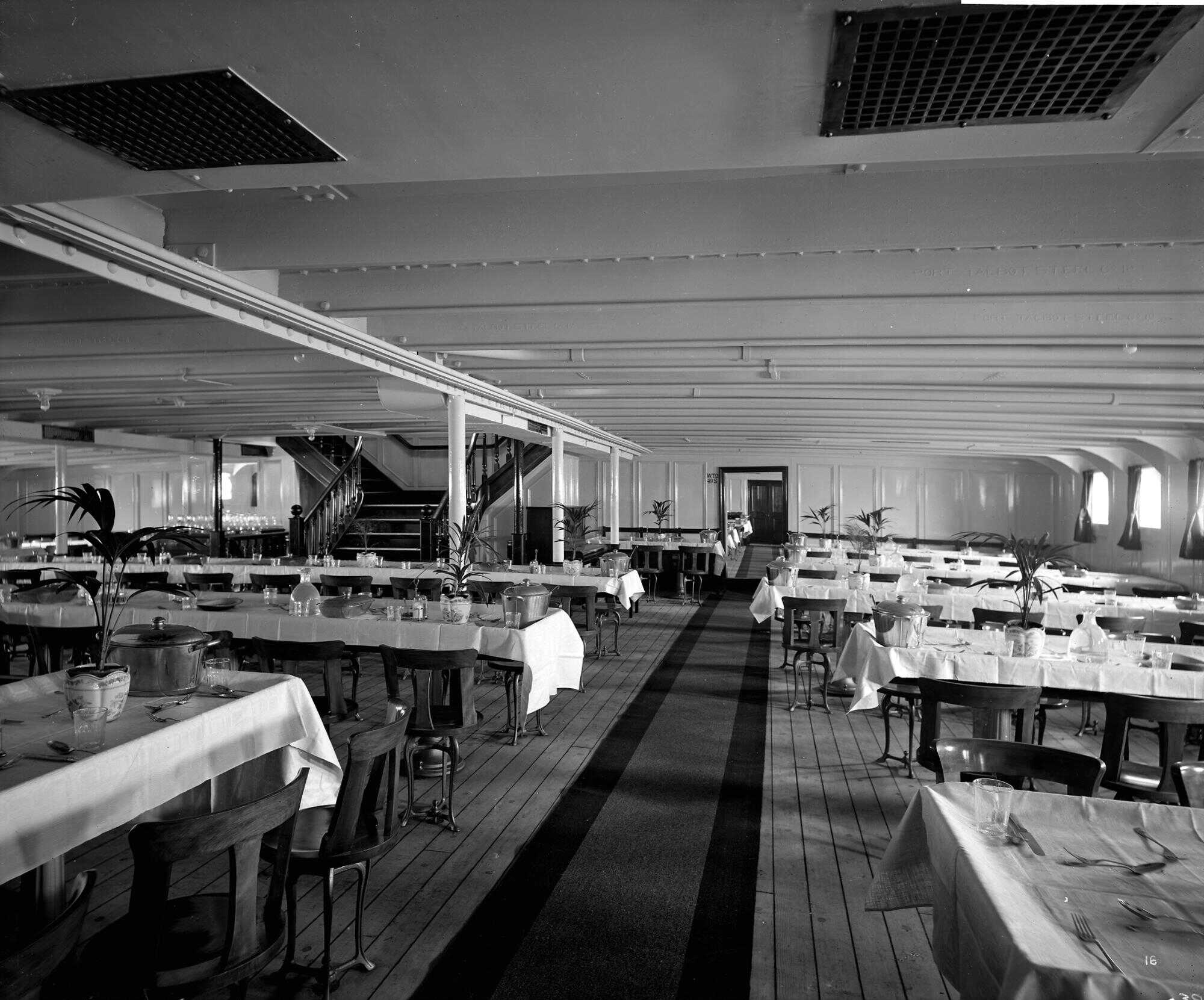
Third Class Dining Saloon.

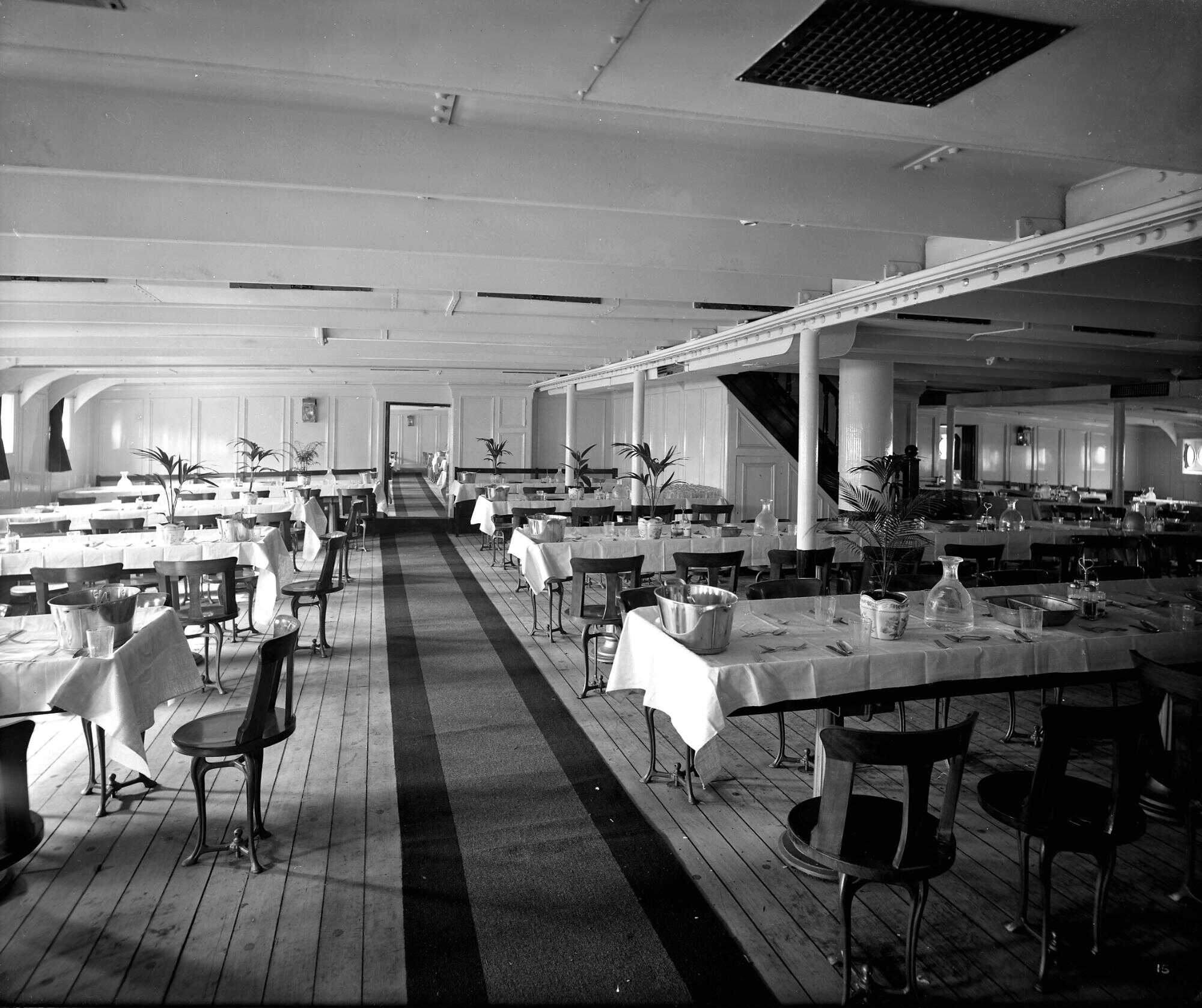
Third Class Dining Saloon.

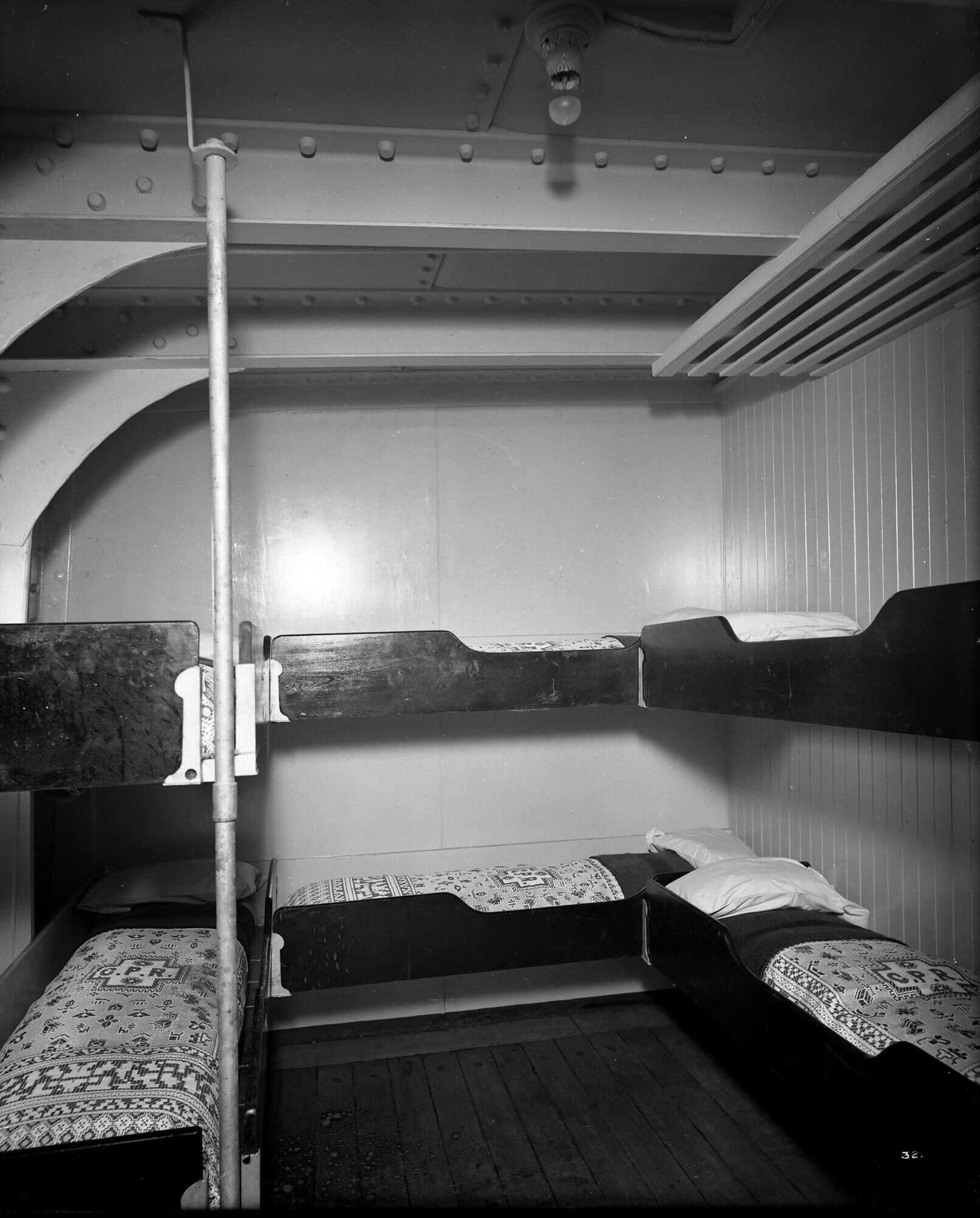
Third Class cabin.
