= SS Metagama =

Cabin class transatlantic liner

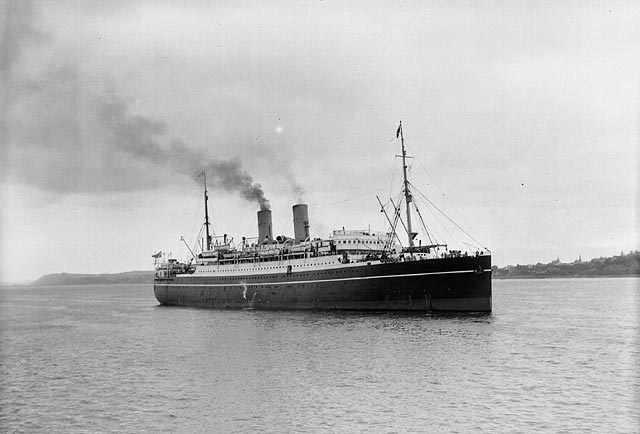
- Metagama in the St. Lawrence River in 1927

History

United Kingdom
- Name: Metagama
- Namesake: Metagama, Ontario
- Owner: Canadian Pacific Railway Co
- Operator: Canadian Pacific Steamship Co
- Port of registry: London
- Route: 1915: Liverpool – St John, NB; 1927: Antwerp – Montreal
- Builder: Barclay, Curle & Co
- Yard number: 511
- Launched: 19 November 1914
- Completed: March 1915
- Maiden voyage: 27th March 1915
- Identification: UK official number 134791; code letters JKDF (until 1933); call sign GMLQ (by 1930)
- Fate: Scrapped 1934

General characteristics
- Type: Ocean liner
- Tonnage: 12,420 GRT, 7,484 NRT
- Length: 500.4 ft (152.5 m)
- Beam: 64.2 ft (19.6 m)
- Depth: 37.9 ft (11.6 m)
- Decks: 2
- Installed power: 1,492 NHP
- Propulsion: 2 × quadruple expansion engines; 2 × screws
- Speed: 16 knots (30 km/h)
- Capacity: Passengers: 520 first class, 1,200 cabin class; 46,070 cubic feet (1,305 m^{3}) refrigerated cargo
- Sensors & processing systems: as built: submarine signalling; by 1924: wireless direction finding
- Notes: sister ship: Missanabie

SS Metagama was a transatlantic ocean liner that was launched in 1914 and scrapped in 1934. The Canadian Pacific Railway Co owned her and the Canadian Pacific Steamship Co operated her. She was a pioneering example of a "cabin class" passenger ship.

== Building ==
Before the First World War, Canadian Pacific ordered a pair of liners from Barclay, Curle & Co on the River Clyde in Glasgow, Scotland. Canadian Pacific planned the pair to pioneer a new concept in passenger accommodation, in which there was no first class or second class but instead a single "cabin class".

Barclay, Curle built Missanabie and Metagama as yard numbers 510 and 511. Missanabie was launched on 22 June 1914 and Metagama on 19 November. Metagama was completed in March 1915. Her registered length was 500.4 ft (152.5 m), her beam was 64.2 ft (19.6 m) and her depth was 37.9 ft (11.6 m). Her holds had 46,070 cubic feet (1,305 m^{3}) of refrigerated space for perishable cargo. Her tonnages were 12,420 GRT and 7,484 NRT.

Metagama had twin screws, each driven by a four-cylinder quadruple expansion engine. Between them her twin engines were rated at 1,492 NHP and gave her a speed of 16 knots (30 km/h).

Canadian Pacific registered Metagama at London. Her UK official number was 134791 and her code letters were JKDF.

== Career ==
Missanabie served in the First World War as troop ships. A U-boat sank her in 1918 with the loss of 45 lives.

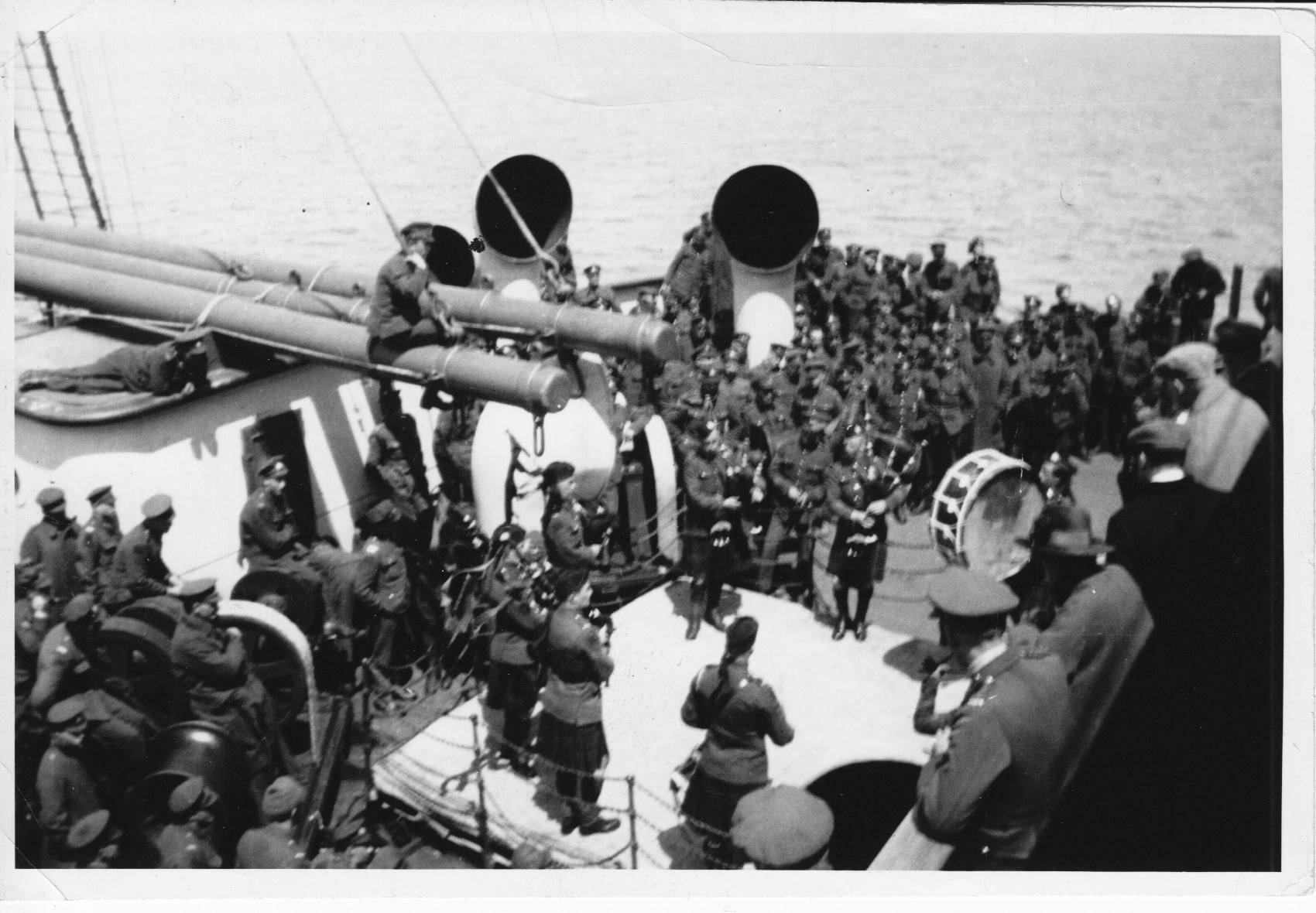
A pipe band entertaining troops on deck aboard Metagama in 1915

Metagama remained in civilian passenger service, although her passengers often included troops. Her first regular route was between Liverpool and St John, New Brunswick. She sometimes served Glasgow, and from 1927 her route was between Antwerp and Montreal.

The Metagama played a significant role in the 20th century migration of people from the Outer Hebrides to Canada. On Saturday 21 April 1923, she sailed from Stornoway with 300 young Lewis emigrants on board, all but 20 of them young men, with an average age of 22. This was one of the first waves of mass emigration from the islands, and had a profound effect on the island culture and history.

Metagama was involved in two collisions. The first was on 26 May 1923, when she collided with Hogarth Line's cargo steamship Baron Vernon in the River Clyde.

In June 1924 Metagama was westbound to Montreal when the Italian steamship Clara Camus collided with her about seven miles off Cape Race, Newfoundland. Clara Camus' bow made a hole 15 by 3 feet (5 by 1 m) in the Matagama's port side. Metagama launched a lifeboat crewed by three crewmen to inspect the damage, but in the fog the boat drifted away from the ship and disappeared. The United States Coast Guard Cutter Tampa later found the boat, but its three occupants were missing. Metagama was towed into port and her 695 passengers were transferred to another CP liner, Montreal, on which they completed their journey to Montreal.

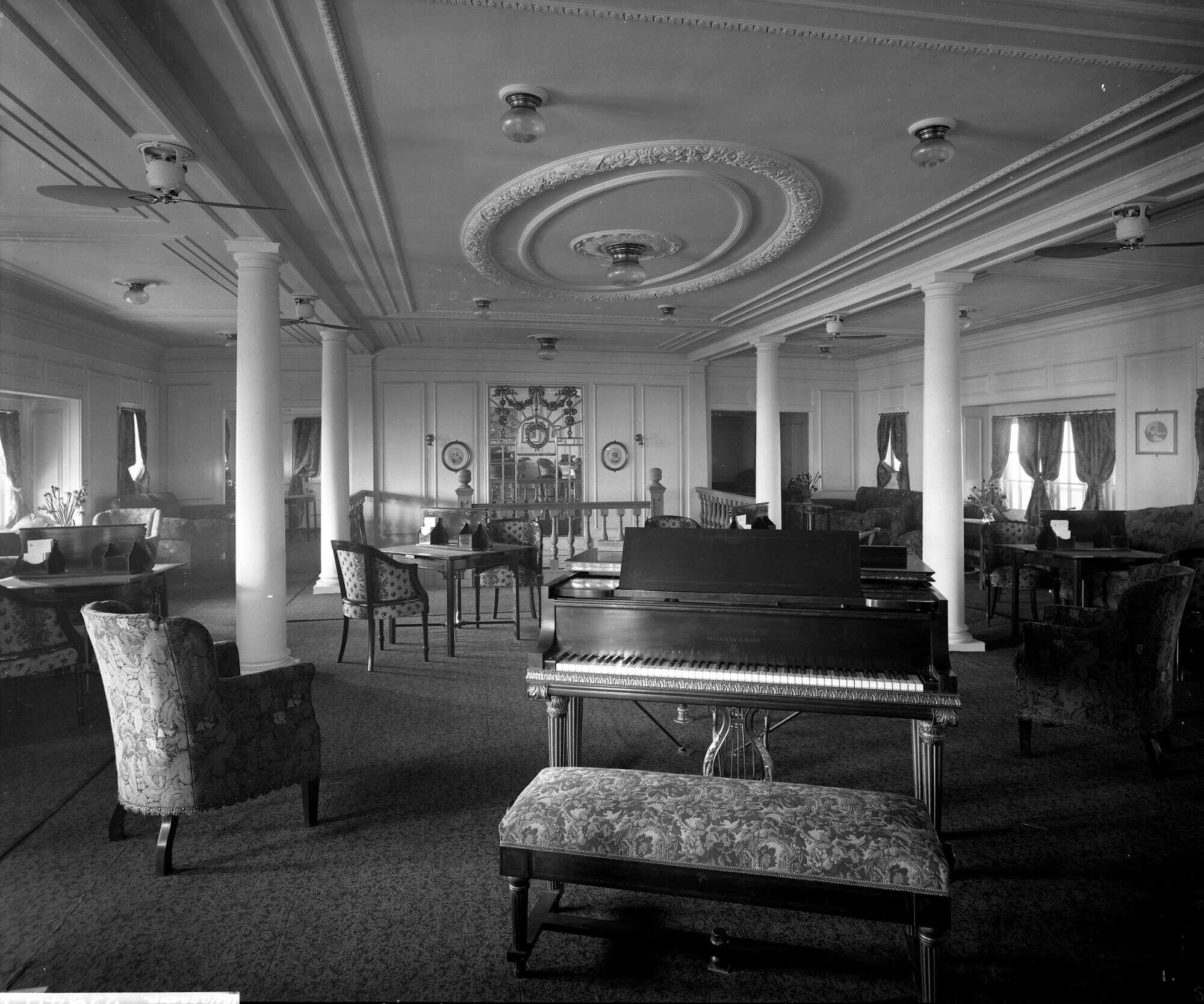
Metagama's cabin class lounge, with piano

By 1924 Metagama's navigation equipment included wireless direction finding. By 1930 her wireless telegraph call sign was GMLQ.

The Great Depression that began in 1929 led to a global slump in merchant shipping. From 1931 Metagama was laid up at Southend-on-Sea in England. On 13 April 1934 she arrived at Bo'ness on the Firth of Forth, where P&W MacLellan scrapped her.

== Bibliography ==
- Emmons, Frederick (1972). The Atlantic Liners 1925–70. New York: Bonanza Books. ISBN 978-0517209837.
- Harnack, Edwin P (1930) [1903]. All About Ships & Shipping (4th ed.). London: Faber and Faber.
- "Lists of vessels fitted with refrigerating appliances". Lloyd's Register of Shipping. Vol. I–Sailing Vessels, Owners, &c. London: Lloyd's Register of Shipping. 1917. Part I.—List of vessels having a capacity of 80,000 cubic feet and over, and including all vessels holding Lloyd's R.M.C. – via Internet Archive.
- Lloyd's Register of Shipping. Vol. II–Steamers. London: Lloyd's Register of Shipping. 1917 – via Internet Archive.
- Lloyd's Register of Shipping. Vol. II–Steamers and Motorships. London: Lloyd's Register of Shipping. 1924 – via Internet Archive.
- Mercantile Navy List. 1930 – via Crew List Index Project.
- Wilson, RM (1956). The Big Ships. London: Cassell & Co.
