= USCGC Cahoone =

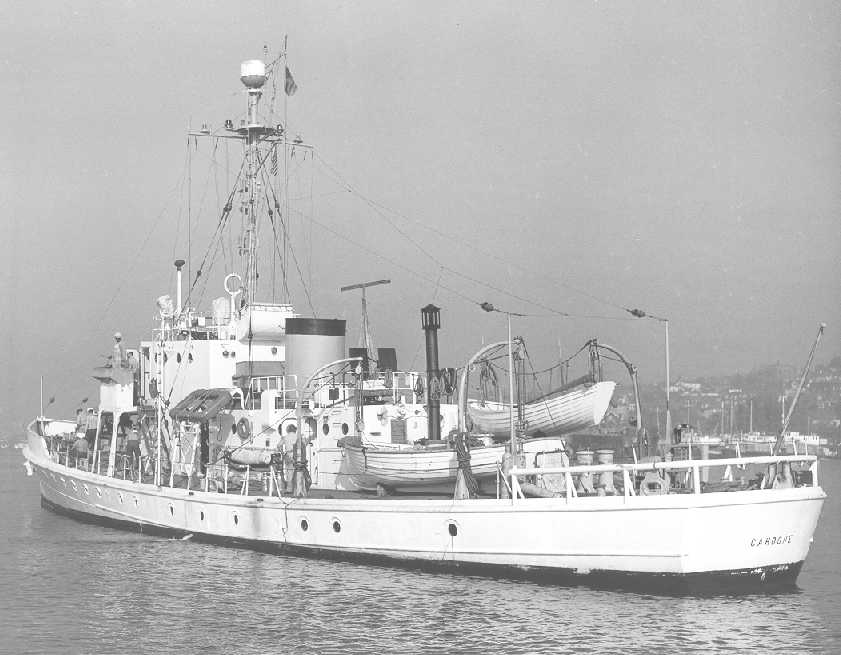
- USCGC Cahoone (WSC-131)

History

United States
- Name: USCGC Cahoone
- Builder: American Brown Boveri Electric Corp., Camden, NJ
- Launched: 27 January 1927
- Commissioned: 21 February 1927
- Decommissioned: 11 March 1968
- Fate: Sold 12 December 1968

General characteristics
- Class & type: Active-class patrol boat
- Displacement: 232 tons
- Length: 125 feet
- Beam: 23.5 feet
- Draft: 7.5 feet
- Propulsion: 2 x 6-cylinder, 300 hp engines
- Speed: Maximum: 13 knots, 1945; Cruise: 8.0 knots
- Range: 3,500 miles; Max. Speed: 2,500 miles
- Complement: 3 officers, 17 men (1960)
- Armament: 1927: 1x 3"/27 1941: 1 x 3 in (76 mm), 2 x depth charge tracks; 1945: 1 x 40 mm/80 (single), 2 x 20 mm/80 (single), 2 x depth charge tracks, 2 x Mousetraps; 1960: 1 x 40mm/60

USCGC Cahoone (WPC/WSC/WMEC-131) was an Active-class patrol boat of the United States Coast Guard. Launched in 1927, she served until 1968.

== Class history ==
This class of vessels was one of the most useful and long-lasting in the Coast Guard with 16 cutters still in use in the 1960s. The last to be decommissioned from active service was the Morris in 1970; the last in actual service was the Cuyahoga, which sank after an accidental collision in 1978. They were designed for trailing the "mother ships" along the outer line of patrol during Prohibition. They were constructed at a cost of $63,173 each. They gained a reputation for durability that was only enhanced by their re-engining in the late 1930s: their original 6-cylinder diesels were replaced by significantly more powerful 8-cylinder units that used the original engine beds and gave the vessels 3 additional knots. All served in World War II, but two, the Jackson and Bedloe, were lost in a storm in 1944. Ten were refitted as buoy tenders during the war and reverted to patrol work afterward.

== Cutter history ==
Stationed at Stapleton, New York, Cahoone took part in the rescue of survivors of the cruise ship Morro Castle, which burned off New Jersey in 1934. She was at Curtis Bay, Maryland, in 1936 and at Morehead City, North Carolina, in 1937. By 1940 she was at San Pedro, California, where she remained through World War II. From 1946 to 1954, she was at Mount Edgecumbe, Alaska. She was stationed at Galveston, Texas, until 1968.
