= USCGC Legare (WSC-144) =

US Coast Guard Cutter

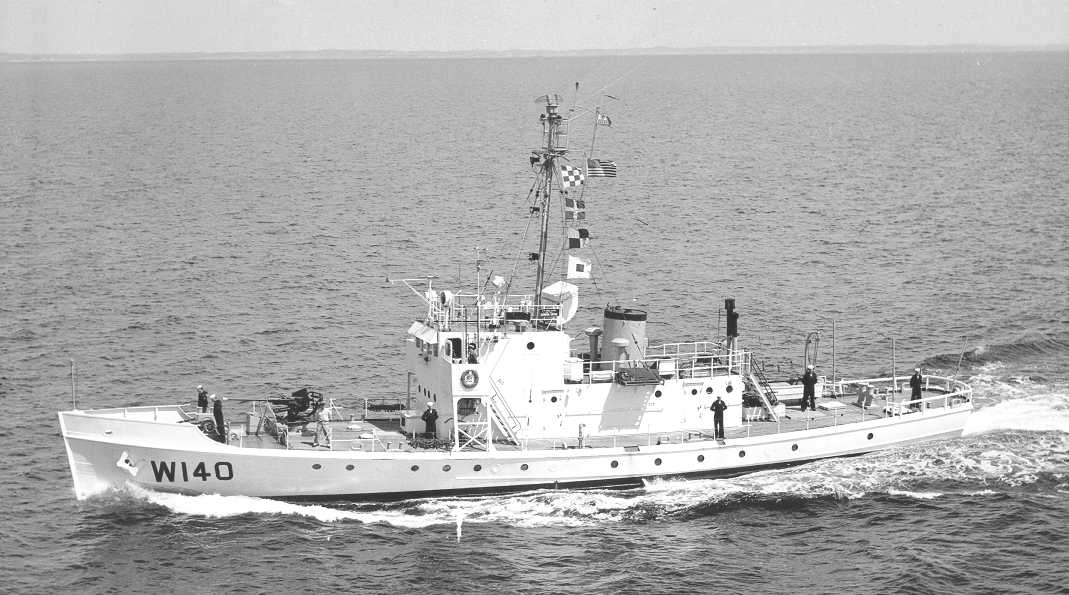
- Sister ship USCGC General Greene (WPC-140).

History

United States
- Name: USCGC Legare
- Namesake: Hugh Swinton Legare
- Operator: United States Coast Guard
- Builder: American Brown Boveri Electrical Corporation, Camden, New Jersey
- Cost: US$63,173.00
- Launched: February 14, 1927
- Commissioned: March 17, 1927
- Decommissioned: March 5, 1968
- Reclassified: WMEC-144 in 1966
- Home port: Norfolk, Virginia, New Bedford, Massachusetts, New London, Connecticut
- Fate: Unknown

General characteristics
- Class & type: Active-class patrol boat
- Displacement: 232 tons
- Length: 125 feet
- Beam: 23 feet, 6 inches
- Draft: 7 feet, 6 inches
- Propulsion: 2 x 6-cylinder, 300 hp engines
- Range: 3,500 nmi (6,500 km; 4,000 mi) At max. speed: 2,500 nmi (4,600 km; 2,900 mi)
- Boats & landing craft carried: 2 long boats
- Complement: 20 men (3 officers, 17 enlisted men)
- Armament: 1927: 1 × 3"/27 caliber gun; 1941: 1 × 3"/23 caliber gun; 2 × depth charge tracks; 1945: 1 × 40 mm/60 (single); 2 × 20 mm/70 (single); 2 × depth charge tracks; 2 × Mousetrap ASW; 1960: 1 × 40 mm/60

USCGC Legare (WSC-144) was cutter that served in the United States Coast Guard for almost forty-one years.

== Namesake ==
Legare was named in honor of Hugh Swinton Legare, the 16th Attorney General of the United States. Born in Charleston, South Carolina, on 2 January 1797, he graduated from the College of South Carolina in 1814. For the next three years he studied law, then traveled in Europe, studying French in Paris and Roman law, philosophy, mathematics, and chemistry in Edinburgh, Scotland. Upon his return to South Carolina in 1820, he was elected to the South Carolina General Assembly. He served until 1822, and again from 1824 to 1830, when he was elected attorney general of South Carolina. In 1832, he was chargé d'affaires at Brussels. Upon his return to the United States, he was elected to the United States Congress. He served from 1837 until 1839. President John Tyler appointed him Attorney General of the United States in 1841. He died in Boston, Massachusetts, on 29 June 1843 while attending ceremonies at the unveiling of the Bunker Hill Monument.

== Class history ==
This class of vessels was one of the most useful and long-lasting in U.S. Coast Guard service, with 16 cutters still in use in the 1960s. The last to be decommissioned from active service was USCGC Morris (WPC-147) in 1970; the last in actual service was USCGC Cuyahoga (WIX-157), which sank after an accidental collision in 1978. They were designed to trail the Coast Guard mother ships along the outer line of patrol against rumrunners during Prohibition. They were constructed at a cost of US$63,173 each. They gained a reputation for durability that was only enhanced by their re-engining in the late 1930s; their original 6-cylinder diesel engines were replaced by significantly more powerful 8-cylinder units that used the original engine beds and gave the vessels an additional 3 knots (5.6 km/h; 3.5 mph) of speed. All served in World War II (1941–1945), and two, USCGC Bedloe (WSC-128) and USCGC Jackson (WSC-142), were lost in a storm in 1944 during their war service. Ten were refitted as buoy tenders during World War II and reverted to patrol work afterward.

== Cutter history ==
=== Construction and commissioning ===
USCGC Legare built by the American Brown Boveri Electrical Corporation in Camden, New Jersey. She was commissioned on 17 March 1927.

=== Pre-World War II ===
Legare patrolled from New London, Connecticut, as part of the Coast Guard's campaign against rumrunners during Prohibition. In 1929, Legare pursued and seized the rumrunner Flor Del Mar, which was promptly abandoned by its crew. In 1931 she transferred to Pascagoula, Mississippi, to patrol the United States Gulf Coast.

Legare next was stationed at Norfolk, Virginia. In accordance with Executive Order 8929 of 1 November 1941, the Coast Guard was transferred from the control of the United States Department of the Treasury and began to operate under the control of the United States Navy. Fitted out to tend lighthouses, buoys, and other aids to navigation, Legare operated in the inland waterways of the United States and along the United States East Coast. She also served on coastal patrol and search-and-rescue duty.

=== World War II ===
Legare continued to operate from Norfolk after the United States entered World War II with the Japanese attack on Pearl Harbor on 7 December 1941. While on patrol on 19 March 1942, she received word of a submarine contact 8 nautical miles (15 km; 9.2 mi) south of Hatteras, North Carolina. She steamed to the area, made contact, and attacked, expending all eight of her depth charges. Her crew observed Oil, debris, and air bubbles on the surface, but the sinking of a submarine at that position on that date was not confirmed by captured documents examined after the war.

Legare picked up three survivors from the merchant ship SS David H. Atwater on 2 and 3 April 1942 and transported them to Chincoteague, Virginia.

On 14 April 1942, Legare was about 100 nautical miles (185 km; 115 mi) off Cape Charles, Virginia, when she detected a submarine on the surface at 20:30 and closed to investigate. Legare exchanged recognition with the submarine and established that she was a United States Navy vessel, USS Mackerel (SS-204), making a voyage on the surface from New London, Connecticut, to Norfolk. No notice of Mackerel′s voyage had been given to local U.S. antisubmarine warfare forces, so Legare′s crew offered to escort Mackerel the rest of the way to Norfolk, and Mackerel′s crew accepted the offer. The two vessels headed for Norfolk in company at 21:30. By 23:15, Legare was about 2,000 yards (1,830 m) astern of Mackerel when she saw Mackerel make two quick course alterations and changed course herself to conform to Mackerel′s movements. Mackerel′s crew, meanwhile, sighted two torpedoes headed for her and evaded them, then sighted what they believed was a German U-boat on the surface and observed it firing a single torpedo at Legare. Mackerel fired two torpedoes at the U-boat, which outran Mackerel and disappeared into the darkness apparently unscathed. Legare sighted a torpedo headed directly for her which her crew thought Mackerel had fired, and took evasive action, and the torpedo passed down Legare′s port side at a distance of only 20 yards (18 m). Legare lost contact with Mackerel and searched for the U-boat for the next 2 1/2 hours but found no sign of it. A subsequent investigation of the incident by the Eastern Sea Frontier found it impossible to reconcile the reports of the two vessels and concluded that Mackerel had mistakenly fired a torpedo at Legare.

On 25 June 1942, Legare was ordered to patrol and perform convoy escort duty in the Caribbean under the command of the Caribbean Sea Frontier, and so served until the end of hostilities in 1945.

=== Post-World War II ===
Executive Order 9606 returned the Coast Guard to the control of the Department of the Treasury on 1 January 1946. Legare subsequently served as buoy tender at Brownsville, Texas. She later performed patrol as well as search-and-rescue duties while stationed in [New Bedford, Massachusetts, and Freeport, Massachusetts.

On 25 July 1956 at 23:10, the large Italian luxury passenger liner SS Andrea Doria and the Swedish ocean liner MS Stockholm collided in the Atlantic Ocean in heavy fog 45 nautical miles (83 km; 52 mi) south of Nantucket Island. Stockholm's special bow, designed to cut through ice, struck Andrea Doria amidships, ripping a great hole her side. During the early-morning hours of 26 July 1956, Legare departed her home port of New Bedford, the first U.S. Coast Guard cutter to respond to an SOS from Andrea Doria.

One of many ships to respond, Legare was the first U.S. Coast Guard cutter to arrive at the scene of the disaster and was present for the entire rescue operation. She rescued survivors from Andrea Doria's lifeboats and transported them to larger vessels on the scene, such as the French Line's SS Île de France, which had diverted from her eastbound voyage from New York City to her home port of Le Havre, France, to render assistance to Andrea Doria. After the rescue operation had concluded and Andrea Doria had sunk, Legare, along with other Coast Guard cutters, used gunfire to sink Andrea Doria′s abandoned lifeboats, which maritime authorities had deemed a hazard to navigation.

Legare was redesignated as a medium endurance cutter and given the new hull classification symbol WMEC-144 in 1966. She was decommissioned in 1968 after 41 years of service.
