= USCGC Reliance =

USCGC Reliance may refer to the following ships of the United States Coast Guard:

- USCGC Reliance (WSC-150), was an Active-class cutter of the United States Coast Guard
- USCGC Reliance (WMEC-615), is a Reliance-class cutter of the United States Coast Guard

== See also ==
- USS Reliance (1860), was a screw steamer used by the United States Revenue Cutter Service during the American Civil War before being captured by the Confederate States of America
- Reliance-class cutter, a Medium endurance cutter class operated by the United States Coast Guard
