= USCGC Morris =

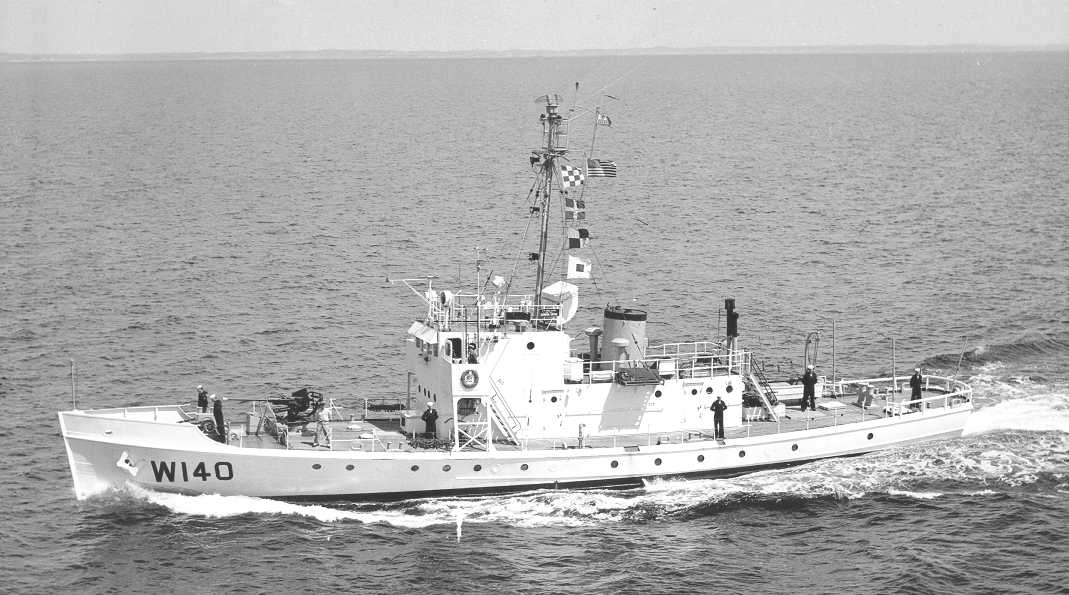
- Active class patrol boat, 1962

History

United States
- Name: USCGC Morris
- Namesake: Robert Morris
- Operator: U.S. Coast Guard; (1927-1941); (1946-1971); U.S. Navy; (1941-1946); Sea Scouts; (1971-2015); Liberty Maritime Museum; (2015-2021); Vietnam Aviation Museum, Galveston, Texas; (2021-present)
- Builder: American Brown Boveri Electric Corporation, Camden, New Jersey
- Cost: US$63,163
- Launched: 4 April 1927
- Commissioned: 19 April 1927
- Decommissioned: 7 August 1971
- Identification: MMSI number: 367323170; Callsign: WDE2300; Pennant number: WSC/WMEC-147
- Fate: Donated to Liberty Maritime Museum
- Status: Museum ship at Sacramento River

General characteristics
- Class & type: Active-class patrol boat
- Displacement: 232 tons (trial)
- Length: 125 ft (38 m)
- Beam: 23 ft 6 in (7.16 m)
- Draft: 7 ft 6 in (2.29 m)
- Installed power: After 1938 re-engining: 1,200 brake horsepower (0.9 megawatt)
- Propulsion: As built: Two 6-cylinder 300 brake horsepower diesel engines; After 1938 re-engining: Two 800 brake horsepower General Motors diesel engines
- Speed: As built: 10 knots; In 1945: 12 knots (maximum); 7 knots (economical)
- Range: In 1945: 2,900 nautical miles (5,370 kilometers) at 10 knots; 4,000 nautical miles (7,400 kilometers) at 7 knots
- Complement: 20 (3 officers, 17 enlisted men) (1930); 46 (5 officers, 41 men) (1945)
- Sensors & processing systems: Sonar (1945) QCO-1; Detection radar (1960) SPS-23
- Armament: In 1927: 1 x 3-inch (76.2-millimeter) 23-caliber gun; In 1941: 2 x depth charge tracks; In 1945: 1 x 3-inch (76.2-mm) 23-caliber gun, 2 x single 20-mm 80-caliber gun mounts, 2 x depth charge tracks, 2 x Mousetraps1 x 3-inch (76.2-mm) 23-caliber gun1 x 3-inch (76.2-mm) 23-caliber gun; In 1960: 1 x single 40-mm 60-caliber antiaircraft gun mount

USCGC Morris (WSC-147), was a 125 ft (38 m) United States Coast Guard Active-class patrol boat in commission from 1927 to 1971. She was named for Robert Morris, (1734–1806) who was appointed in 1789 as United States Senator from Pennsylvania. In May 1966, she was redesignated as (WMEC-147).

== Development and design ==
Active-class were designed for trailing the "mother ships" along the outer line of patrol during Prohibition. They were constructed at a cost of $63,173 each. They gained a reputation for durability that was only enhanced by their re-engining in the late 1930s; their original 6-cylinder diesels were replaced by significantly more powerful 8-cylinder units that used the original engine beds and gave the vessels an additional 3 knots. All served in World War II, but two, the Jackson and Bedloe, were lost in a storm in 1944. Ten were refitted as buoy tenders during the war and reverted to patrol work afterward.

Originally designated WPC, for patrol craft, they were re-designated WSC, for sub chaser, in February 1942, during World War II. The "W" appended to the SC (Sub Chaser) designation identified vessels as belonging to the U.S. Coast Guard. Those remaining in service in May 1966 were re-designated as medium endurance cutters, WMEC.

== Construction and career ==
Morris was laid down and launched by American Brown Boveri Electric Corporation, Camden on 4 April 1927. She was commissioned on 19 April 1927.

In 1939, the Morris was under the command of Lt. Henry Frederick Garcia.

Her command was transferred to the US Navy in 1941 until 1946.

The Morris, identifiable by its "W147" marking, plays a prominent role in a 1961 episode of the television series Perry Mason entitled "The Case of the Traveling Treasure."

In May 1966, she was redesignated as WMEC-147. In 1971, USCGC Morris was the last Active-class ship to be decommissioned.

== Since decommissioning ==
The Morris was decommissioned on 7 August 1970 and acquired by the Boy Scouts of America, where she was used as a Sea Scout Ship in Sacramento, California.

She was overhauled by Liberty Maritime Museum in Sacramento between 2000-2010, and sold to the Vietnam War Flight Museum in Houston for use as a museum ship in 2021. She transited through the Panama Canal under her own power to Galveston, Texas, where she currently lies.

== See also ==
- Rum Patrol
