= USCGC Tiger =

US Coast Guard patrol boat

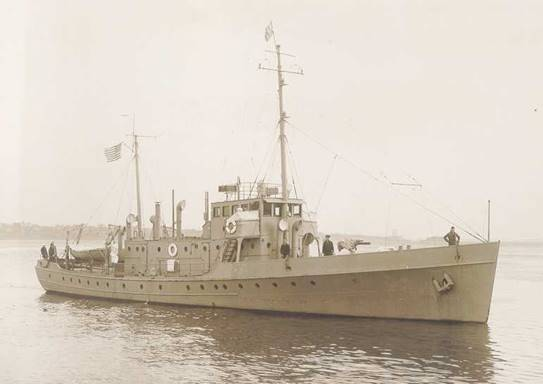
- USCGC Tiger (WSC-152) 20 December 1928

History

United States
- Name: Tiger
- Owner: United States Coast Guard
- Builder: American Brown Boveri Electric Corp., Camden, New Jersey
- Yard number: 346
- Way number: J
- Laid down: 1 February 1927
- Launched: 18 April 1927
- Acquired: 29 April 1927
- Commissioned: 3 May 1927
- Decommissioned: 12 November 1947
- Identification: WPC-152
- Honors and awards: Was awarded 1 Battle Star
- Fate: Sold on 14 June 1948 as Polar Merchant, floating hulk in Tacoma, Washington

General characteristics
- Class & type: Active-class patrol boat
- Displacement: 232 tons
- Length: 125 ft (38.1 m)
- Beam: 23.6 ft (7.2 m)
- Draft: 7.6 ft (2.3 m)
- Propulsion: 2 × 6-cylinder, 300 hp (220 kW) engines
- Speed: 10 knots (19 km/h; 12 mph)
- Complement: 3 officers and 17 men
- Armament: 1 3"/27 caliber gun (1927); 2 depth charge racks were added during World War II

The USCGC Tiger (WSC-152) was an Active-class patrol boat of the United States Coast Guard. The vessel guarded the entrance to Pearl Harbor all day and night on 7 December 1941, during the Attack on Pearl Harbor during World War II.

== Design and construction ==
USCGC Tiger (WSC-152) was the 28th of 35 ships in the Active class of patrol boats, designed to serve as a "mother ship" in support of Prohibition enforcement operations against bootleggers and smugglers along the coasts. They were meant to be able to stay at sea for long periods of time in any kinds of weather, and were able to expand berthing space via hammocks if the need arose, such as if a large number of rescued shipwreck survivors were on board. Built by the American Brown Boveri Electric Corporation of Camden, New Jersey, she was laid down on 1 February 1927. The cutter was launched on 18 April, transferred to the Coast Guard on 29 April and commissioned three months after she was laid down, on 3 May 1927. Like the rest of her class, she was 125 feet (38 m) long, had a 22-foot-6-inch (6.86 m) beam and a 7-foot-6-inch (2.29 m) draft. A single 3-inch (76 mm) gun was mounted as the offensive weapon as launch. She was numbered as hull No. 346 before being given a name, and launched from slipway J with five other sister ships.

== Service history ==
Tiger was placed in commission at 11:25 am on 3 May 1927. The vessel operated out of Coast Guard Base Two in Stapleton, New York, until shifting to Norfolk, Virginia, arriving there on 6 June 1933. Subsequently, the 125 ft (38.1 m) cutter was transferred to the Territory of Hawaii and operated out of Honolulu. In mid-1941, she came under jurisdiction of the United States Navy and was assigned to the local defense force of the 14th Naval District. Equipped with depth charges and listening gear, Tiger then operated out of Honolulu Harbor in company with her sister ship USCGC Reliance and the 327 ft (99.7 m) USCGC Taney into late 1941.

On 7 December, the Imperial Japanese Navy launched a surprise attack on the Pacific Fleet at its Pearl Harbor base and surrounding facilities on the island of Oahu.Tiger, patrolling off Barber's Point that morning, won her only Battle Star of the war for participation during the attack.

According to Tiger's after action report she may have detected one of the Japanese mini-subs attempting to enter Pearl Harbor while on her patrol the morning of the attack on Pearl Harbor: "At 0500 7 December, 1941 underway for cruise of south shore of Oahu on various courses and half speed. At 0645 while off Barbers Point picked up reference (e) and commenced Q.C. soundings. At 0715 Barbers Point Lighted buoy abeam to port, .5 mile C/C to 80 degrees psc., picked up underwater object with Q.C. and maneuvered about in order to better ascertain position, stopped both engines to reduce interference but Q.C. sounds faded out."

On 27 December 1941, Tiger came across and rescued fourteen survivors in a lifeboat of the US freighter SS Prusa, which had been torpedoed and sunk by the Japanese submarine I-72 150 miles south of Oahu on 18 December. At the time Tiger was towing one of US freighter Manini's lifeboats, which had been sunk by the same submarine the day before Prusa and her survivors rescued by the destroyer USS Allen earlier that day.

On 29 March 1942, while patrolling off the harbor entrance, members of Tiger's crew boarded the American gasoline screw Simba and found an unauthorized passenger aboard. The ship was subsequently ordered back to Honolulu Harbor to discharge the passenger.

Tiger was based out of Honolulu Harbor for the entire war, escorting ships and convoys in and out of the harbor with sister ship Reliance; one ship being on duty at a time with the other on standby in the harbor, with longer breaks occasionally for upgrades and repairs.

== Fate ==
She was decommissioned on 12 November 1947. On 14 June 1948 the cutter was sold as Polar Merchant #257391, and eventually was completely stripped and used as a floating hull in Tacoma, Washington in 2018.
