= Active-class patrol boat =

US Coast Guard patrol vessel

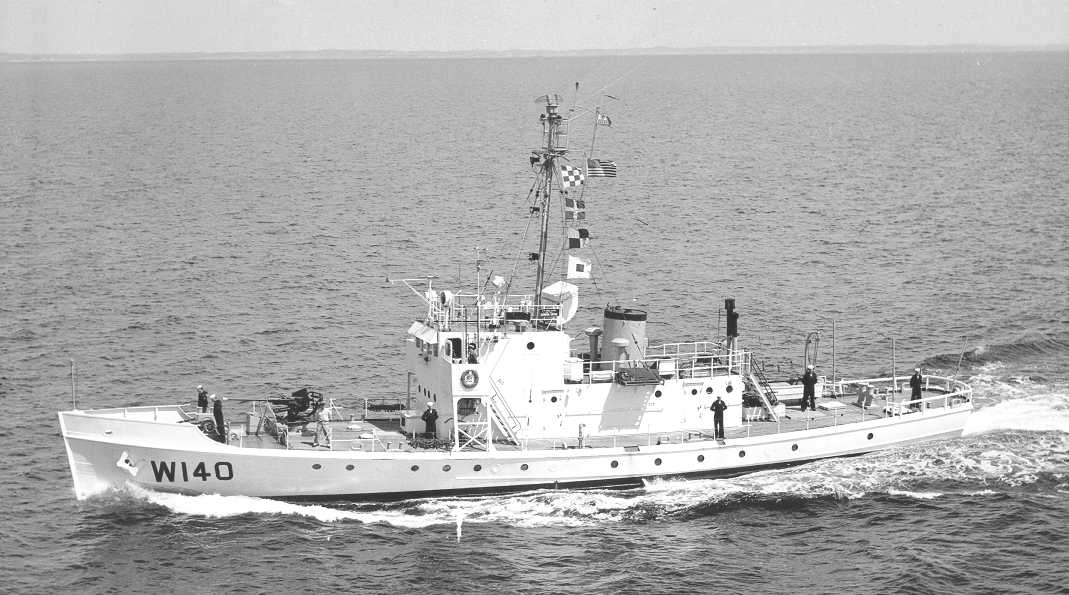
- Active-class patrol boat General Greene, 1962

Class overview
- Name: Active class
- Builders: American Brown Boveri Electric Corporation, Camden, New Jersey
- Operators: United States Coast Guard; United States Navy (WWII)
- Built: 1926–1927
- In commission: 1927–1978
- Completed: 35
- Lost: 4
- Retired: 32
- Scrapped: 2 confirmed
- Preserved: 1

General characteristics
- Type: Patrol boat
- Displacement: 232 long tons (236 t)
- Length: 125 ft (38 m)
- Beam: 23 ft 6 in (7.16 m)
- Draft: 7 ft 6 in (2.29 m)
- Propulsion: At launch: 2 × 6-cylinder, 300 hp (224 kW) Winton Model 114-6 diesel engines 1938: 2 x Cooper-Bessemer EN-9 600 bhp diesel engines 2 Propellers
- Speed: 1945; Maximum: 13 knots (24 km/h; 15 mph); Cruise: 8 kn (15 km/h; 9.2 mph)
- Range: 3,500 nmi (6,500 km; 4,000 mi); At max. speed: 2,500 nmi (4,600 km; 2,900 mi)
- Boats & landing craft carried: As built: 2 20' Pulling Boats 1976: 1 14' Utility Boat
- Complement: 1938: 22 1944: 38 1960: 3 officers, 17 men
- Armament: 1927: 1 × 3"/27 caliber gun; 1941: 1 × 3"/23 caliber gun; 2 × depth charge tracks, 10 depth charges; 1945: 1 × 40 mm/60 (single); 2 × 20 mm/70 (single); 2 × depth charge tracks; 2 × Mousetrap ASW; 1960: 1 × 40 mm/60
- Notes: 1 600-watt 12" spotlight

The Active-class patrol boat was one of the most useful and long-lasting classes of United States Coast Guard cutters. Of the 35 built in the 1920s, 16 were still in service during the 1960s. The last to be decommissioned from active service was the Morris in 1970; the last in actual service was the Cuyahoga, which sank after an accidental collision in 1978.

== Design and construction ==
The Active-class was designed for trailing the "mother ships" along the outer line of patrol during Prohibition. They were constructed at a cost of $63,173 USD each ($979,038.74 in 2021 rates). They gained a reputation for durability that was only enhanced by their re-engined in the late 1930s; their original 6-cylinder Winton 114-6 diesels were replaced by significantly more powerful 8-cylinder units that used the original engine beds and gave the vessels an additional 3 knots. They were meant to be able to stay at sea for long periods of time in any kind of weather, and were able to expand berthing space via hammocks if the need arises, such as if a large number of survivors were on board.

Each ship was 125 feet [28.1 m] long, 23 feet 6 inches [7.1 m] wide, and had a draft of 7 feet 6 inches [2.1 m].

=== Equipment ===
At launch, each cutter was fitted with a Winton Model 109 air compressor and Model 99 oil pump. A carbon dioxide fire suppression system was built by the Kidde Company, which in addition to water hoses powered by a seven and a half horsepower electric motors composed the ships' fire suppression. A 8,00-watt, 32 volt generator by the Hill Diesel Engine Company of Lansing, Michigan was driven by a 12-horsepower diesel engine which provided ship wide power.

== History ==
All the ships served in World War II, however the Jackson and Bedloe were lost in a storm in 1944. USCGC McLane is credited with the sinking of the inactive IJN submarine Ro-32. Ten (Note: The ten Actives used as buoy tenders were Active (WPC-125), Colfax (WPC-133), Crawford (WPC-134), Ewing (WPC-137), Harriet Lane (WPC-141), Legare (WPC-144), McLane (WPC-146), Vigilant (WPC-154), Diligence (WPC-135), and Woodbury (WPC-155).) were refitted as buoy tenders between 1941 and 1942 and reverted to patrol work afterward.

Originally designated WPC, (Coast Guard patrol craft), they were re-designated WSC, for Coast Guard sub chaser, in February 1942. The "W" appended to the SC (Sub Chaser) designation identified vessels as belonging to the U.S. Coast Guard. Those remaining in service in May 1966 were re-designated as medium endurance cutters, or WMEC.

The ships were informally nicknamed "Buck & a Quarters" in reference to their length, 100 feet (a buck, or $1.00) plus an additional 25 (A quarter, or 25 cents).

=== Notable events ===
==== 1944 sinking of Jackson and Bedloe ====
On 14 September 1944, USCGC Jackson (WSC-142) was instructed to rendezvous with the cutter USCGC Bedloe (WSC-128) and the tug USS Escape (ARS-6) to assist in the towing of the Liberty ship SS George Ade which had been torpedoed by the German submarine U-518 and driven ashore in a storm. After arriving in the area near the Outer Banks, weather conditions quickly deteriorated to hurricane conditions throughout the morning. Known as the Great Hurricane of 1944, the storm reportedly brought waves up to 100–125 feet (30–38 m) and 50-mile-per-hour winds. The ships were repeatedly thrown from the top of swells into the wave trough, causing heavy listing and impacting maneuverability and communications. At 10:30 AM Jackson capsized followed by Bedloe at 1:30. 37 crew members from Jackson and all 38 from Bedloe successfully made it off their ships, yet only 30 from Bedloe gained a hold on life rafts. High winds, waves, and sea pests hampered survival efforts as lifeboats were flipped and survivors scattered. The crews of both cutters believed they would be saved by the other, not knowing both ships had sunk. The lifeboats of Bedloe were spotted 51 hours after sinking and the Jackson's was seen 58 hours later. The rafts were spotted by a Coast Guard aircraft operating from Elizabeth City, North Carolina. Rescue aircraft began landing along with the crew members as the United States Navy blimps dropped emergency food and coordinated a rescue. A third 38-foot cutter from Oregon Inlet Lifeboat Station picked up survivors to be transferred to a navy minesweeper before being hospitalized at Norfolk, Virginia. 26 crew members from Bedloe and an additional 21 from Jackson died during the ordeal. The original mission, to tow George Ade into port, succeeded in the sense that the ship suffered minimal damage and no casualties.

==== 1978 sinking of Cuyahoga ====
On 20 October 1978 USCGC Cuyahoga (WIX-157) was underway in the Chesapeake Bay to train officer cadets with intentions to turn into port for the night. The cutter was the oldest in-service ship in the Coast Guard's fleet and had fallen into a state of disrepair from lack of maintenance. Natural low light levels made navigation harder with ships relying on signal lights for identification. The Cuyahoga was planning to turn into port when the lights of Argentine bulk cargo vessel M/V Santa Cruz II were spotted. The captain of the cutter considered the lights displayed to be that of a small fishing boat and failed to alter plans. This belief was further aided by the radar showing a small contact at range. The captain of Santa Cruz II believed the cutter would continue on course, allowing them to pass parallel to each other without incident. Cuyahoga believed the assumed smaller sailboat would see the large cutter turn and change course accordingly and committed to the plan. The Santa Cruz II sounded a whistle to notify that it would be the cutter's duty to maneuver out of a collision, yet received no response. It was only when a collision was inevitable that both captains realized the situation as a whole and attempted to respond. The Santa Cruz II sounded horns and signals, ordering all engines reversed and hard port while the cutter attempted to reverse. The two ships were too close to allow for any meaningful action. The bow of Santa Cruz II penetrated the starboard corner of the cutter's wheelhouse, cutting a three-foot hole in the hull as it moved aft at 2107 local time. A one-foot high by two-foot wide hole opened four feet below the waterline which doomed the ship. The shock caused the Cuyahoga to tip 50 degrees to one side, throwing men and equipment overboard. Survivors were able to gain a hold on the 14 foot [4.2 m] utility boat which had broken off and risen to the surface. The ship sank in 2 minutes, killing 11 of 29 crew members. The surviving 18 sailors were rescued by the Santa Cruz II. An official investigation by the U.S. Coast Guard blamed the collision on Cuyahoga's captain for his failure to correctly identify signal lights of the oncoming vessel and ensuing decision to turn into a path for collision as the reason.

==== 2021 sinking of Alert ====
It has been reported that the former USCGC Alert (WMEC-127) sank on 1 November 2021 west of the I5 Bridge in Portland, Oregon in the Columbia River after being moored off Hayden Island. The ship fell into disrepair after a homeless encampment moved on board, hampering hopes for preservation. The homeless groups and dock were removed December 2020, although officials had no long-term plan for the ship as potential costs were too high. The vessel was heavily damaged by graffiti and stripped parts. Although not fully sunk, a light on top of the pilothouse can be seen in images as the ship rests in mud. No cause of sinking has been announced.

== Ships preserved ==
- USCGC Morris is owned by the Vietnam War Flight Museum in Houston, and currently moored in Galveston, Texas.

== Ship naming ==
Each Active-class boat adopted the names of either officers or former cutters of the US Revenue Cutter Service, a predecessor of the Coast Guard. Several names were new for the time, while a name such as the Alert has been on the sides of six cutters by 1927. Most of the former cutters the boats were named after carried the name of a United States Secretary of the Treasury.

== Ships in class ==
Ship name	Hull symbol	Yard number	Slipway launched	Laid down	Launched	Delivered	Commissioned	Decommissioned	Fate	Notes
Active	WPC-125	#320	L	24 July 1926	30 November 1926	12 January 1927	30 November 1926	2 April 1962	Sold, 6 September 1963	Used as buoy tender between 1941 and 1942.
Active	WSC-125	#320	L	24 July 1926	30 November 1926	12 January 1927	30 November 1926	2 April 1962	Sold, 6 September 1963	Used as buoy tender between 1941 and 1942.
Agassiz	WSC-126	#321	L	24 July 1926	30 November 1926	19 January 1927	20 January 1927	13 October 1969	Sold, 16 October 1969	Damaged in collision with MV Prince George off Cape Ann, 7 July 1928.
Agassiz	WMEC-126	#321	L	24 July 1926	30 November 1926	19 January 1927	20 January 1927	13 October 1969	Sold, 16 October 1969	Damaged in collision with MV Prince George off Cape Ann, 7 July 1928.
Alert	WSC-127	#322	L	24 July 1926	30 November 1926	25 January 1927	27 January 1927	10 January 1969	Sold, 6 October 1969 Museum ship before being abandoned and sinking on November 1, 2021, in Portland, Oregon	
Alert	WMEC-127	#322	L	24 July 1926	30 November 1926	25 January 1927	27 January 1927	10 January 1969	Sold, 6 October 1969 Museum ship before being abandoned and sinking on November 1, 2021, in Portland, Oregon	
Antietam Later renamed Bedloe	WPC-128	#323	L	24 July 1926	30 November 1926	22 January 1927	January 1927	n/a	Foundered in storm, 14 September 1944	
Antietam Later renamed Bedloe	WSC-128	#323	L	24 July 1926	30 November 1926	22 January 1927	January 1927	n/a	Foundered in storm, 14 September 1944	
Bonham	WPC-129	#324	L	24 July 1926	30 November 1926	27 January 1927	29 January 1927	20 April 1959	Sold, 30 December 1959 to Northland Marine Lines as Polar Star Sold to Mark Benert Marine Services as Mindy B in 2005	
Bonham	WSC-129	#324	L	24 July 1926	30 November 1926	27 January 1927	29 January 1927	20 April 1959	Sold, 30 December 1959 to Northland Marine Lines as Polar Star Sold to Mark Benert Marine Services as Mindy B in 2005	
Boutwell	WPC-130	#325	J	28 August 1926	27 January 1927	8 February 1927	21 February 1927	7 May 1963	Sold, 16 May 1964 as State Bell #296169 before becoming Rebel in 1972 and Activa in 1979	
Boutwell	WSC-130	#325	J	28 August 1926	27 January 1927	8 February 1927	21 February 1927	7 May 1963	Sold, 16 May 1964 as State Bell #296169 before becoming Rebel in 1972 and Activa in 1979	
Cahoone	WPC-131		J	28 August 1926	27 January 1927		21 February 1927	11 March 1968	Sold, 12 December 1968	
Cahoone	WSC-131		J	28 August 1926	27 January 1927		21 February 1927	11 March 1968	Sold, 12 December 1968	
Cahoone	WMEC-131		J	28 August 1926	27 January 1927		21 February 1927	11 March 1968	Sold, 12 December 1968	
Cartigan	WSC-132	#327	J	28 August 1926	27 January 1927	2 March 1927	3 March 1927	12 October 1968	Sold, 9 April 1969 to private owner for $26,000 Lifted for scrapping in 2004.	Released 300 gallons of fuel oil in 2003 while berthed at New York City
Cartigan	WPC-132	#327	J	28 August 1926	27 January 1927	2 March 1927	3 March 1927	12 October 1968	Sold, 9 April 1969 to private owner for $26,000 Lifted for scrapping in 2004.	Released 300 gallons of fuel oil in 2003 while berthed at New York City
Cartigan	WMEC-132	#327	J	28 August 1926	27 January 1927	2 March 1927	3 March 1927	12 October 1968	Sold, 9 April 1969 to private owner for $26,000 Lifted for scrapping in 2004.	Released 300 gallons of fuel oil in 2003 while berthed at New York City
Montgomery Later renamed Colfax	WPC-133	#340	O	4 December 1926	22 March 1927	4 April 1927	7 April 1927	9 November 1954	Sold, 5 January 1956 as Colfax 271836	Used as buoy tender between 1941 and 1942.
Montgomery Later renamed Colfax	WSC-133	#340	O	4 December 1926	22 March 1927	4 April 1927	7 April 1927	9 November 1954	Sold, 5 January 1956 as Colfax 271836	Used as buoy tender between 1941 and 1942.
Crawford	WPC-134	#328	J	28 August 1926	27 January 1926	17 February 1927	21 February 1927	15 August 1947	Donated to Woods Hole Oceanographic Institution, 28 November 1955 Later sold to the University of Puerto Rico, 1970 Seized by USCGC Manitou (WPB-1302) for drug smuggling, 1986 Fate unknown	Used as buoy tender between 1941 and 1942.
Crawford	WSC-134	#328	J	28 August 1926	27 January 1926	17 February 1927	21 February 1927	15 August 1947	Donated to Woods Hole Oceanographic Institution, 28 November 1955 Later sold to the University of Puerto Rico, 1970 Seized by USCGC Manitou (WPB-1302) for drug smuggling, 1986 Fate unknown	Used as buoy tender between 1941 and 1942.
Diligence	WPC-135	#330	J	28 August 1926	27 January 1927	18 February 1927	22 February 1927	30 September 1961	Sold, 30 January 1963	Used as buoy tender between 1941 and 1942.
Diligence	WSC-135	#330	J	28 August 1926	27 January 1927	18 February 1927	22 February 1927	30 September 1961	Sold, 30 January 1963	Used as buoy tender between 1941 and 1942.
Dix	WPC-136	#331	M	28 August 1926	27 January 1927	4 March 1927	5 March 1927	13 January 1948	Sold, 16 June 1948	
Dix	WSC-136	#331	M	28 August 1926	27 January 1927	4 March 1927	5 March 1927	13 January 1948	Sold, 16 June 1948	
Ewing	WPC-137	#332	L	1 December 1926	15 March 1927	23 March 1927	26 March 1927	23 June 1967	Sold, 23 January 1969 as Pacific Raider to Decorative Surfacing Centers Inc. Extant as Pacific Hunter as of 2019; renamed 1994 For sale at $124,000; moored at Ballard, California as of 2021	Lacked the single 3 inch gun at launch Used as buoy tender between 1941 and 1942.
Ewing	WSC-137	#332	L	1 December 1926	15 March 1927	23 March 1927	26 March 1927	23 June 1967	Sold, 23 January 1969 as Pacific Raider to Decorative Surfacing Centers Inc. Extant as Pacific Hunter as of 2019; renamed 1994 For sale at $124,000; moored at Ballard, California as of 2021	Lacked the single 3 inch gun at launch Used as buoy tender between 1941 and 1942.
Ewing	WMEC-137	#332	L	1 December 1926	15 March 1927	23 March 1927	26 March 1927	23 June 1967	Sold, 23 January 1969 as Pacific Raider to Decorative Surfacing Centers Inc. Extant as Pacific Hunter as of 2019; renamed 1994 For sale at $124,000; moored at Ballard, California as of 2021	Lacked the single 3 inch gun at launch Used as buoy tender between 1941 and 1942.
Faunce	WPC-138	#333	J	1 December 1926	15 March 1927	29 March 1927	1 April 1927	13 January 1948	Sold, 16 June 1948 to Humble Oil Refinery as Humble AC-2 #257810, then Myra White in 1961 and Vitow II in 1964	
Faunce	WSC-138	#333	J	1 December 1926	15 March 1927	29 March 1927	1 April 1927	13 January 1948	Sold, 16 June 1948 to Humble Oil Refinery as Humble AC-2 #257810, then Myra White in 1961 and Vitow II in 1964	
Frederick Lee	WPC-139	#334	L	1 December 1926	15 March 1927	2 April 1927	4 April 1927	15 December 1964	Sold, 19 May 1966 as Virgil E #505701	
Frederick Lee	WSC-139	#334	L	1 December 1926	15 March 1927	2 April 1927	4 April 1927	15 December 1964	Sold, 19 May 1966 as Virgil E #505701	
Frederick Lee	WMEC-139	#334	L	1 December 1926	15 March 1927	2 April 1927	4 April 1927	15 December 1964	Sold, 19 May 1966 as Virgil E #505701	
General Greene	WPC-140	#335	L	2 December 1926	14 February 1927	15 March 1927	7 April 1927	15 November 1968	Sold to Guatemala, 1976 Seized by the US Coast Guard for drug smuggling, 1979 Fate unknown	
General Greene	WSC-140	#335	L	2 December 1926	14 February 1927	15 March 1927	7 April 1927	15 November 1968	Sold to Guatemala, 1976 Seized by the US Coast Guard for drug smuggling, 1979 Fate unknown	
General Greene	WMEC-140	#335	L	2 December 1926	14 February 1927	15 March 1927	7 April 1927	15 November 1968	Sold to Guatemala, 1976 Seized by the US Coast Guard for drug smuggling, 1979 Fate unknown	
Harriet Lane	WPC-141	#319	L	24 July 1926	30 November 1926	31 December 1926	1 January 1927	29 April 1946	Sold into merchant service and renamed MV Humble AC-4 #270632, 16 June 1948 to Humble Oil & Refining Fate unknown	Used as buoy tender between 1941 and 1942.
Harriet Lane	WSC-141	#319	L	24 July 1926	30 November 1926	31 December 1926	1 January 1927	29 April 1946	Sold into merchant service and renamed MV Humble AC-4 #270632, 16 June 1948 to Humble Oil & Refining Fate unknown	Used as buoy tender between 1941 and 1942.
Jackson	WPC-142	#336	L	2 December 1926	4 February 1927	9 March 1927	14 March 1927	n/a	Foundered in storm, 14 September 1944	
Jackson	WSC-142	#336	L	2 December 1926	4 February 1927	9 March 1927	14 March 1927	n/a	Foundered in storm, 14 September 1944	
Kimball	WPC-143	#349	L	1 February 1927	25 April 1927	4 May 1927	7 May 1927	31 December 1968	Sold, 24 February 1970	Served as a training ship for the Merchant Marine Academy in 1939
Kimball	WSC-143	#349	L	1 February 1927	25 April 1927	4 May 1927	7 May 1927	31 December 1968	Sold, 24 February 1970	Served as a training ship for the Merchant Marine Academy in 1939
Legare	WPC-144	#337	L	2 December 1926	14 February 1927	14 March 1927	17 March 1927	5 March 1968	Sold, 29 November 1968 Fate unknown	Used as buoy tender between 1941 and 1942.
Legare	WSC-144	#337	L	2 December 1926	14 February 1927	14 March 1927	17 March 1927	5 March 1968	Sold, 29 November 1968 Fate unknown	Used as buoy tender between 1941 and 1942.
Legare	WMEC-144	#337	L	2 December 1926	14 February 1927	14 March 1927	17 March 1927	5 March 1968	Sold, 29 November 1968 Fate unknown	Used as buoy tender between 1941 and 1942.
Marion	WPC-145	#338	O	4 December 1926	15 March 1927	4 April 1927	6 April 1927	15 February 1962	Sold into merchant service and renamed MV Top Cat, 8 March 1963 Fate unknown	
Marion	WSC-145	#338	O	4 December 1926	15 March 1927	4 April 1927	6 April 1927	15 February 1962	Sold into merchant service and renamed MV Top Cat, 8 March 1963 Fate unknown	
McLane	WPC-146	#339	O	4 December 1926	22 March 1927	6 April 1927	8 March 1927	31 December 1968	Used as buoy tender between 1941 and 1942. Sold, 14 November 1969 Museum ship in Muskegon, Michigan until September 10th, 2025. Now being scrapped in Muskegon.	
McLane	WSC-146	#339	O	4 December 1926	22 March 1927	6 April 1927	8 March 1927	31 December 1968	Used as buoy tender between 1941 and 1942. Sold, 14 November 1969 Museum ship in Muskegon, Michigan until September 10th, 2025. Now being scrapped in Muskegon.	
McLane	WMEC-146	#339	O	4 December 1926	22 March 1927	6 April 1927	8 March 1927	31 December 1968	Used as buoy tender between 1941 and 1942. Sold, 14 November 1969 Museum ship in Muskegon, Michigan until September 10th, 2025. Now being scrapped in Muskegon.	
Morris	WPC-147	#341	O	4 December 1926	4 April 1927	9 April 1927	19 April 1927	7 August 1971	Sold, August 1970 Operated by the West Sacramento Sea Scouts from 1971 before being sold Museum ship in Galveston, Texas	Lacked the single 3-inch gun at construction
Morris	WSC-147	#341	O	4 December 1926	4 April 1927	9 April 1927	19 April 1927	7 August 1971	Sold, August 1970 Operated by the West Sacramento Sea Scouts from 1971 before being sold Museum ship in Galveston, Texas	Lacked the single 3-inch gun at construction
Morris	WMEC-147	#341	O	4 December 1926	4 April 1927	9 April 1927	19 April 1927	7 August 1971	Sold, August 1970 Operated by the West Sacramento Sea Scouts from 1971 before being sold Museum ship in Galveston, Texas	Lacked the single 3-inch gun at construction
Nemaha	WPC-148	#342	O	4 December 1926	4 April 1927	13 April 1927	19 April 1927	21 July 1947	Sold, 14 June 1948	
Nemaha	WSC-148	#342	O	4 December 1926	4 April 1927	13 April 1927	19 April 1927	21 July 1947	Sold, 14 June 1948	
Pulaski	WPC-149	#343	O	4 December 1926	4 April 1927	13 April 1927	30 April 1927	4 December 1946	Sold, 14 July 1948	
Pulaski	WSC-149	#343	O	4 December 1926	4 April 1927	13 April 1927	30 April 1927	4 December 1946	Sold, 14 July 1948	
Reliance	WPC-150	#344	J	1 February 1927	18 April 1927	22 April 1927	26 April 1927	11 March 1968	Sold for scrap, 16 June 1948	
Reliance	WSC-150	#344	J	1 February 1927	18 April 1927	22 April 1927	26 April 1927	11 March 1968	Sold for scrap, 16 June 1948	
Rush	WPC-151	#345	J	1 February 1927	18 April 1927	26 April 1927	27 April 1927	21 August 1947	Sunk in collision with M/V J. A. Moffett Jr. in Ambrose Channel, 29 December 1927, later refloated Sold, 16 January 1948. Renamed Humble AC-1 with the Humble Oil & Refining Co. in 1949. Renamed Vitow I with Virgin Islands Towing Co in 1964.	
Rush	WSC-151	#345	J	1 February 1927	18 April 1927	26 April 1927	27 April 1927	21 August 1947	Sunk in collision with M/V J. A. Moffett Jr. in Ambrose Channel, 29 December 1927, later refloated Sold, 16 January 1948. Renamed Humble AC-1 with the Humble Oil & Refining Co. in 1949. Renamed Vitow I with Virgin Islands Towing Co in 1964.	
Tiger	WPC-152	#346	J	1 February 1927	18 April 1927	29 April 1927	3 May 1927	12 November 1947	Sold, 14 June 1948 as Polar Merchant #257391 Completely stripped, 2018 serving as a floating hull at Tacoma, Washington.	
Tiger	WSC-152	#346	J	1 February 1927	18 April 1927	29 April 1927	3 May 1927	12 November 1947	Sold, 14 June 1948 as Polar Merchant #257391 Completely stripped, 2018 serving as a floating hull at Tacoma, Washington.	
Travis	WPC-153	#347	J	1 February 1927	18 April 1927	26 April 1927	29 April 1927	5 June 1962	Sold, 15 November 1962 as State Chief #294664	Collided with M/V East Breeze off Halifax, Nova Scotia, 30 November 1944.
Travis	WSC-153	#347	J	1 February 1927	18 April 1927	26 April 1927	29 April 1927	5 June 1962	Sold, 15 November 1962 as State Chief #294664	Collided with M/V East Breeze off Halifax, Nova Scotia, 30 November 1944.
Vigilant	WPC-154	#348	J	1 February 1927	25 April 1927	29 April 1927	3 May 1927	9 November 1954	Sold, 3 January 1956 as Vigilant #271208	Used as buoy tender between 1941 and 1942.
Vigilant	WSC-154	#348	J	1 February 1927	25 April 1927	29 April 1927	3 May 1927	9 November 1954	Sold, 3 January 1956 as Vigilant #271208	Used as buoy tender between 1941 and 1942.
Woodbury	WPC-155	#350	L	16 February 1927	2 May 1927	5 May 1927	11 May 1927	9 November 1954	Sold, 3 January 1956 Renamed Humble AC-3 with Humble Oil Company as a tug. Renamed Challenge with Caribbean Towing Inc. where she serves to this day.	Used as buoy tender between 1941 and 1942.
Woodbury	WSC-155	#350	L	16 February 1927	2 May 1927	5 May 1927	11 May 1927	9 November 1954	Sold, 3 January 1956 Renamed Humble AC-3 with Humble Oil Company as a tug. Renamed Challenge with Caribbean Towing Inc. where she serves to this day.	Used as buoy tender between 1941 and 1942.
Yeaton	WPC-156	#351	L	16 February 1927	2 May 1927	7 May 1927	10 May 1927	18 May 1969	Sold, 16 July 1970	
Yeaton	WSC-156	#351	L	16 February 1927	2 May 1927	7 May 1927	10 May 1927	18 May 1969	Sold, 16 July 1970	
Yeaton	WMEC-156	#351	L	16 February 1927	2 May 1927	7 May 1927	10 May 1927	18 May 1969	Sold, 16 July 1970	
Cuyahoga	WSC-157	#329	J	28 August 1926	27 January 1926	17 February 1927	3 March 1927	3 November 1978 JSTOR	Sunk in collision, 20 October 1978 Refloated, 29 October 1978 Scuttled, 29 March 1979	Transferred to United States Navy 29 May 1933, returned 17 May 1941 as AG-2.
Cuyahoga	AG-2	#329	J	28 August 1926	27 January 1926	17 February 1927	3 March 1927	3 November 1978 JSTOR	Sunk in collision, 20 October 1978 Refloated, 29 October 1978 Scuttled, 29 March 1979	Transferred to United States Navy 29 May 1933, returned 17 May 1941 as AG-2.
Cuyahoga	WIX-157	#329	J	28 August 1926	27 January 1926	17 February 1927	3 March 1927	3 November 1978 JSTOR	Sunk in collision, 20 October 1978 Refloated, 29 October 1978 Scuttled, 29 March 1979	Transferred to United States Navy 29 May 1933, returned 17 May 1941 as AG-2.

== Gallery ==
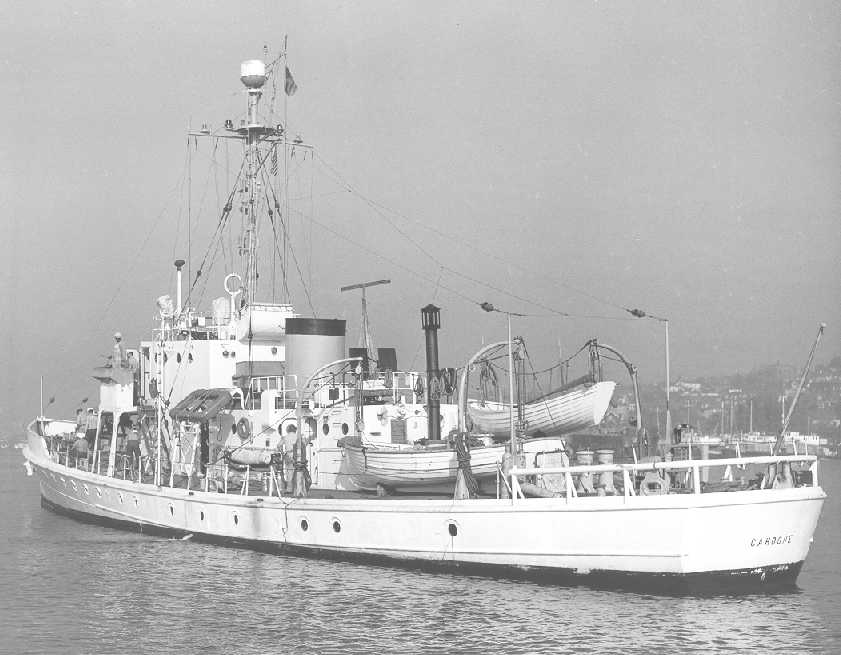
USCGC Cahoone (WSC-131)

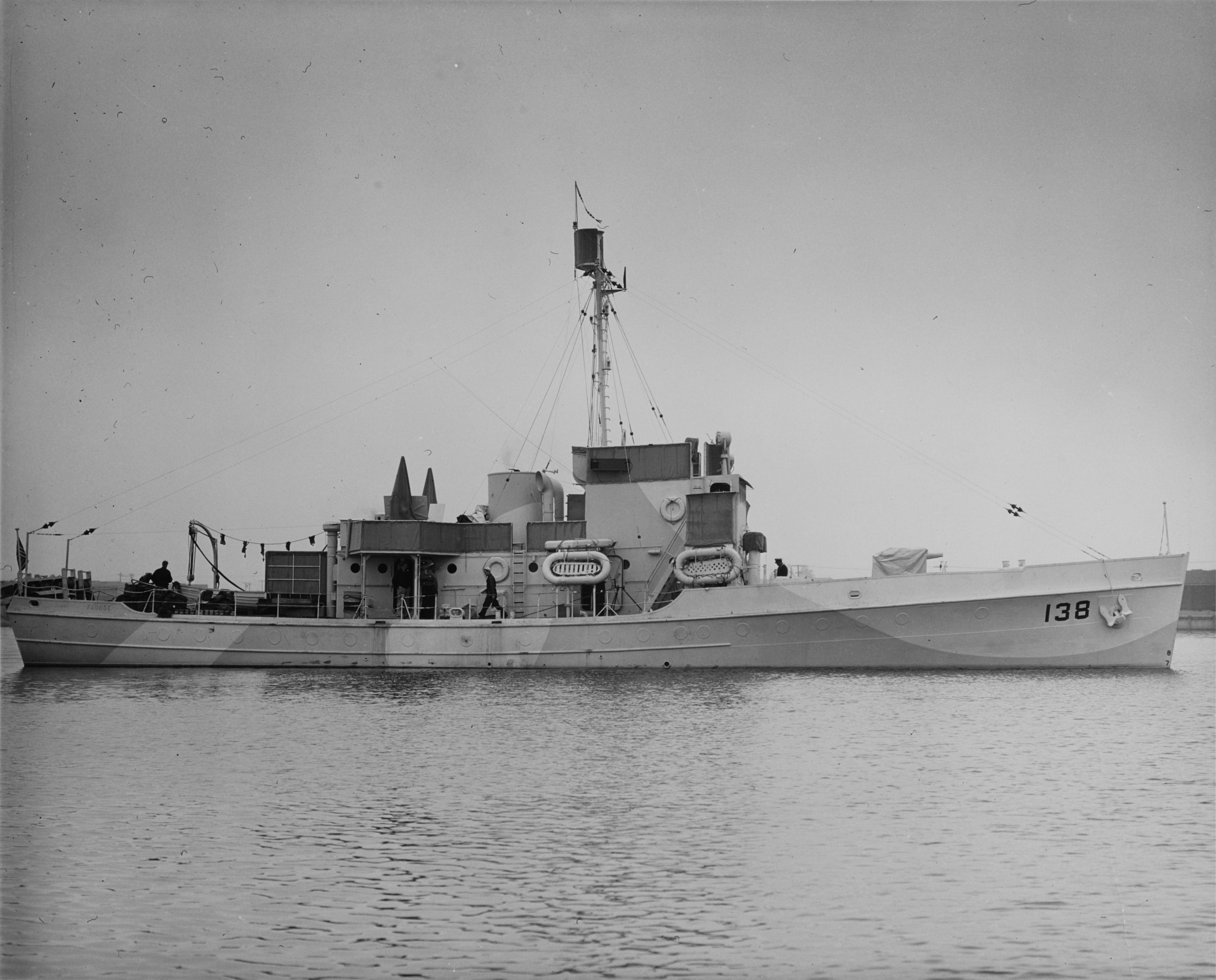
USCGC Faunce (WSC-138) in World War II camouflage

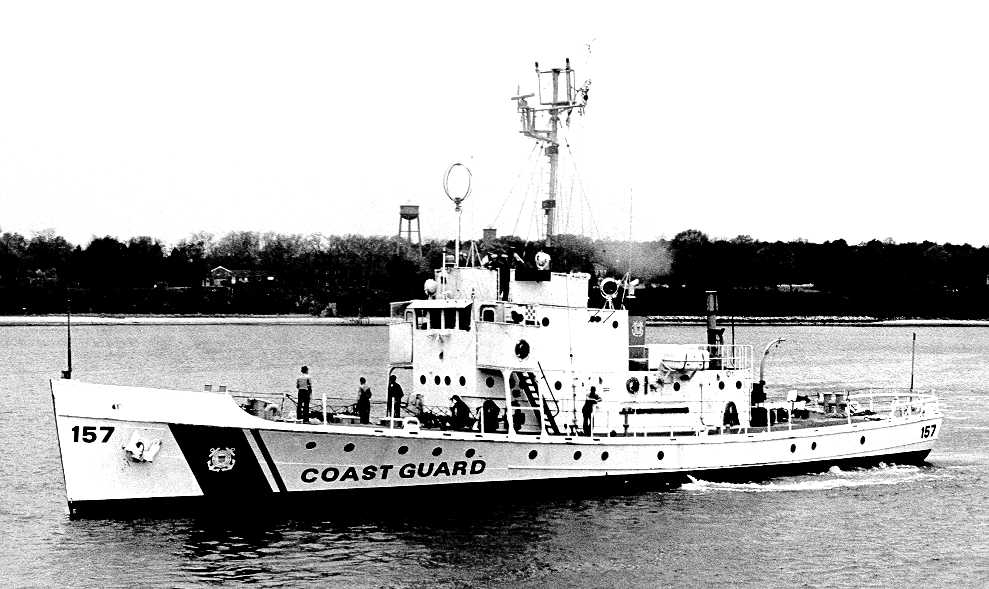
USCGC Cuyahoga (WIX-157)

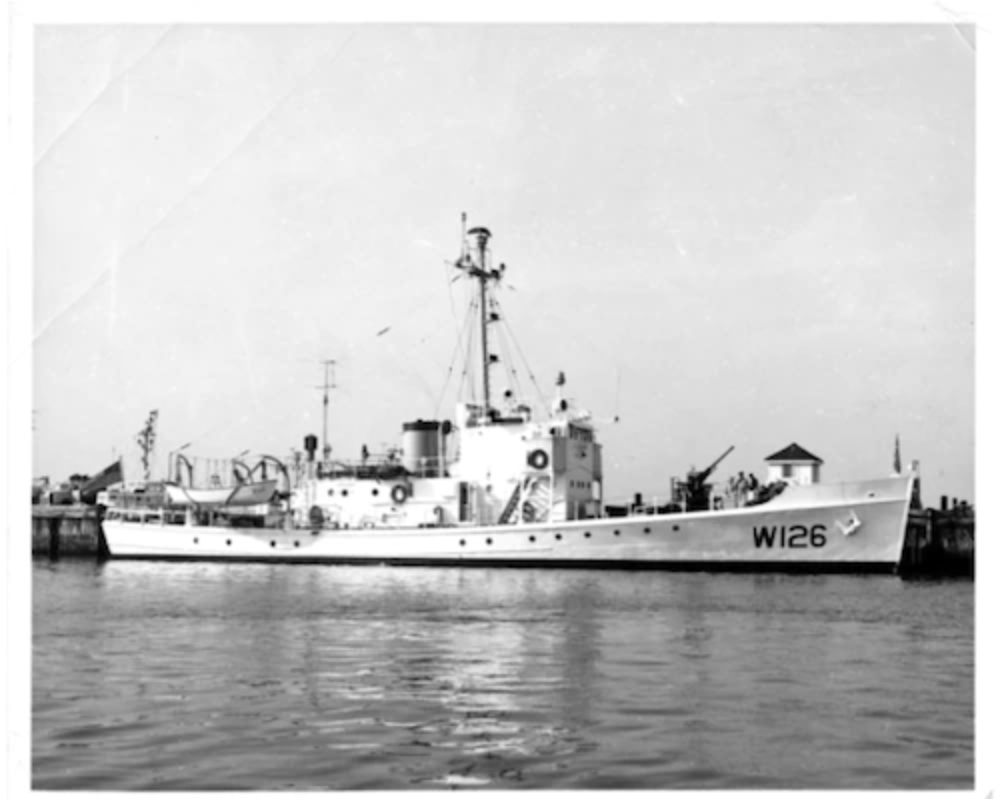
USCGC Agassiz in 1957 at Cape May, New Jersey.

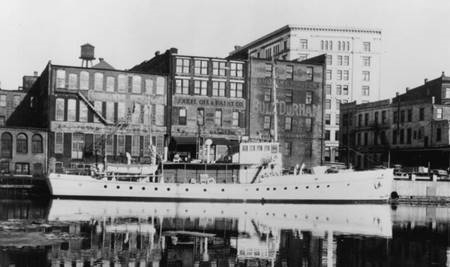
Cutter USCGC Antietam, later Bedloe (WSC-128). Date and location unknown

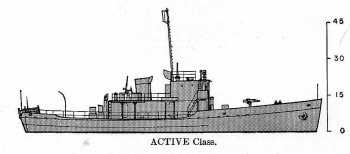
The US Office of Naval Intelligence recognition image for the Active-class cutter during 1943.

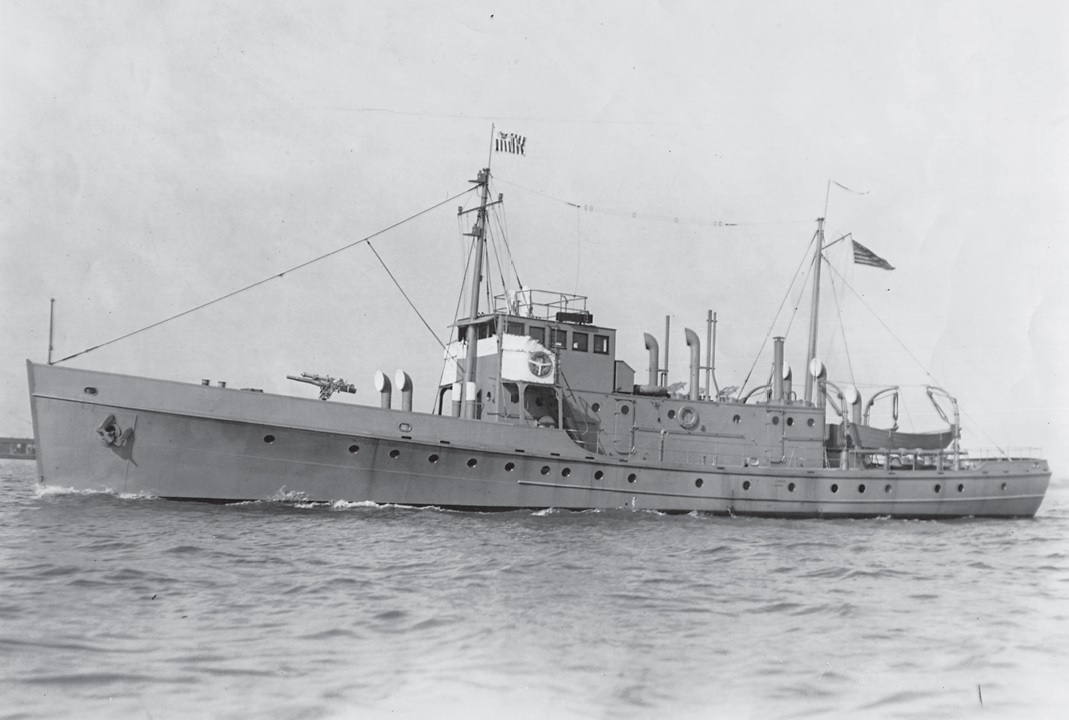
USCGC Jackson on 31 March 1927 on the Delaware River

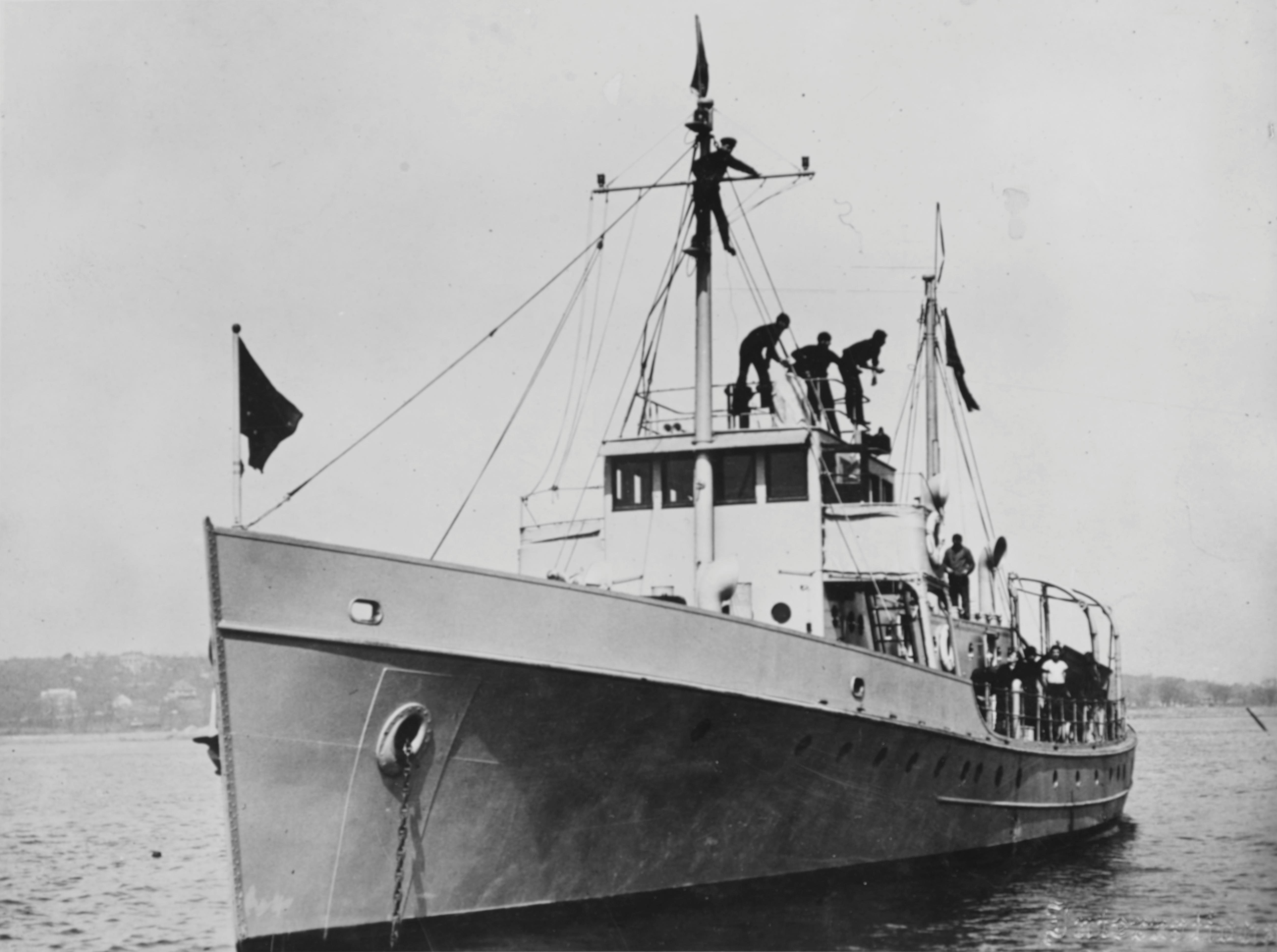
USCGC Active (WPC-125) participating in line-carrying experiments by aviation unit from Base 7, Gloucester, Massachusetts

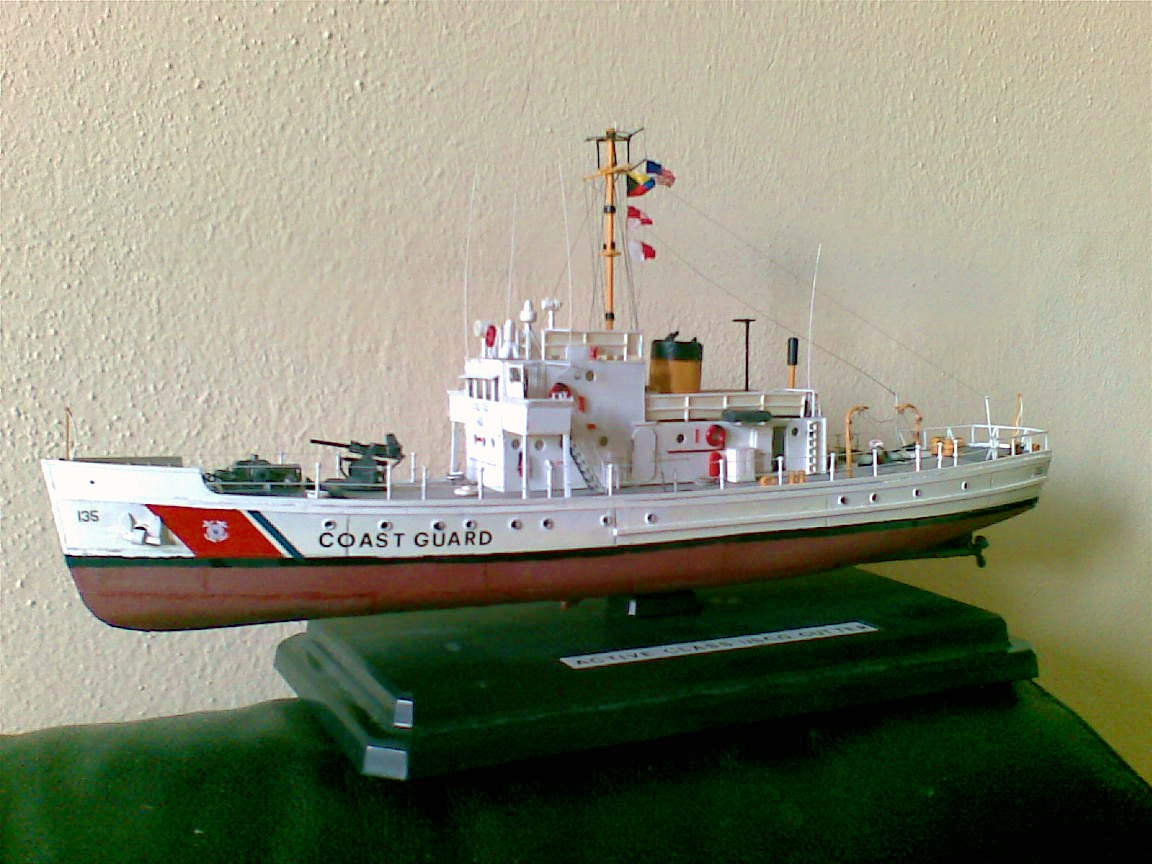
Model of an Active-class cutter in its post World War II configuration
