= USCGC Active (WPC-125) =

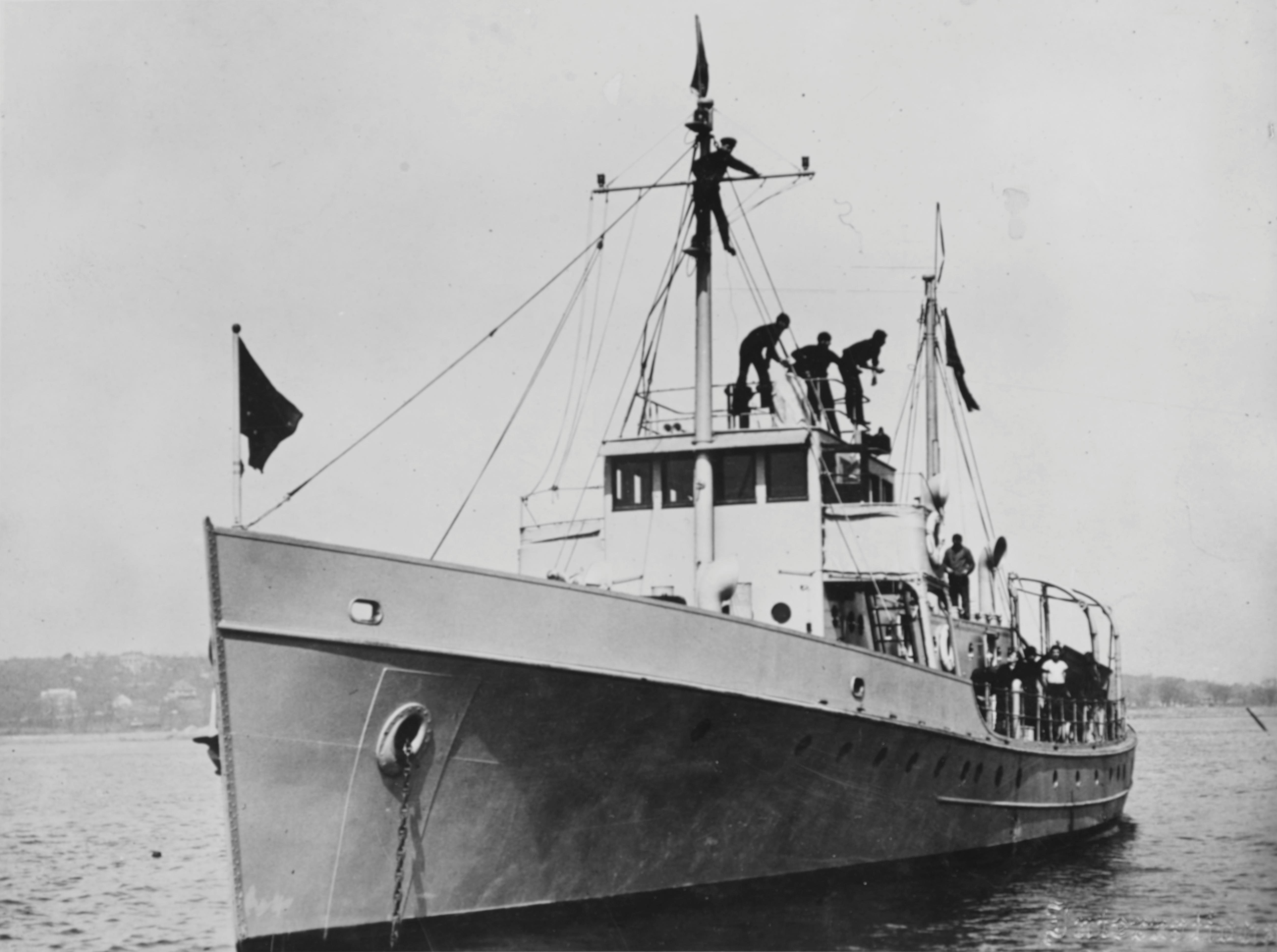
- USCGC Active in 1927

History

United States
- Name: USCGC Active
- Namesake: In action; moving; causing action or change
- Builder: American Brown Boveri Electric Corporation, Camden, New Jersey
- Cost: $63,163 USD
- Commissioned: 30 November 1926
- Decommissioned: 1947
- Recommissioned: 1951
- Decommissioned: 2 April 1962
- Fate: Sold 6 September 1963

General characteristics
- Class & type: Active-class patrol boat
- Displacement: 232 tons (trial)
- Length: 125 ft (38 m)
- Beam: 23 ft 6 in (7.16 m)
- Draft: 7 ft 6 in (2.29 m)
- Installed power: After 1938 re-engining: 1,200 brake horsepower (0.9 megawatt)
- Propulsion: As built: Two 6-cylinder diesel engines; After 1938 re-engining: Two Cooper-Bessemer EN-9 600-brake horsepower (0.45-megawatt) diesel engines
- Speed: As built: 10 knots; In 1945: 13 knots (maximum); 8 knots (economical)
- Range: In 1945: 2,500 nautical miles (4,630 kilometers) at 13 knots; 3,500 nautical miles (6,482 kilometers) at 8 knots
- Complement: 20 (3 officers, 17 enlisted men)
- Armament: In 1927: 1 x 3-inch (76.2-millimeter) 27-caliber gun; In 1941: 1 x 3-inch (76.2-mm) 23-caliber gun, 2 x depth charge tracks; In 1945: 1 x single 40-mm 80-caliber antiaircraft gun mount, 2 x single 20 mm 80-caliber gun mounts, 2 x depth charge tracks, 2 x Mousetrap antisubmarine rocket launchers; In 1960: 1 x single 40-mm 60-caliber antiaircraft gun mount

USCGC Active (WPC-125), later WSC-125, was a United States Coast Guard patrol boat in commission from 1926 to 1947 and from 1951 to 1962. She was the first vessel of the Coast Guard and the seventh of the United States Revenue Cutter Service or Coast Guard to bear the name Active.

== Construction and commissioning ==
Active was built by American Brown Boveri Electric Corporation at Camden, New Jersey. She was commissioned as USCGC Active (WPC-125) on 30 November 1926. She was the lead ship of the Active-class patrol boats, which were designed for trailing the "mother ships" that supported the smuggling boats of "rum-runners" during Prohibition.

== United States Coast Guard service 1926-1962 ==
In 1938, Active was re-engined, her original 6-cylinder diesel engines being replaced by significantly more powerful 8-cylinder units that used the original engine beds and gave her an additional 3 knots of speed.

=== World War II service ===
In September 1941 to May 1942, during World War II, Active was stationed at Stapleton on Staten Island, New York, and this was her base when the United States entered World War II on 7 December 1941. During the war, she was reclassified as a submarine chaser and redesignated WSC-125. She operated out of Stapleton until May 1942.

In June 1942, her home port changed to Boston, Massachusetts, and she was assigned to operate under the control of the United States Navy's Commander-in-Chief Atlantic and to work under Destroyers Atlantic. She operated out of Boston until mid-1944, also operating out of Gronnedal, Greenland, while serving on the Greenland Patrol. She later patrolled Ocean Station Able in the Atlantic Ocean from July 1943 to the summer of 1944.

In mid-1944, Active was transferred to Miami, Florida, from which she provided escort services in the Caribbean until 1945.

=== Post-World War II Atlantic service and lay up ===
In 1946, Active was stationed in Boston again, but was inactive there due to a shortage of personnel. From 1947 to 1950 she was laid up in Cleveland, Ohio.

=== Pacific service ===
Reactivated in 1951, Active was stationed at Monterey, California until 1962, providing aid to navigation and performing law-enforcement duties.

== Decommissioning and disposal ==
After a long and active life, Active was decommissioned at Monterey on 2 April 1962. She was sold on 6 September 1963.
