= USCGC Harriet Lane (WSC-141) =

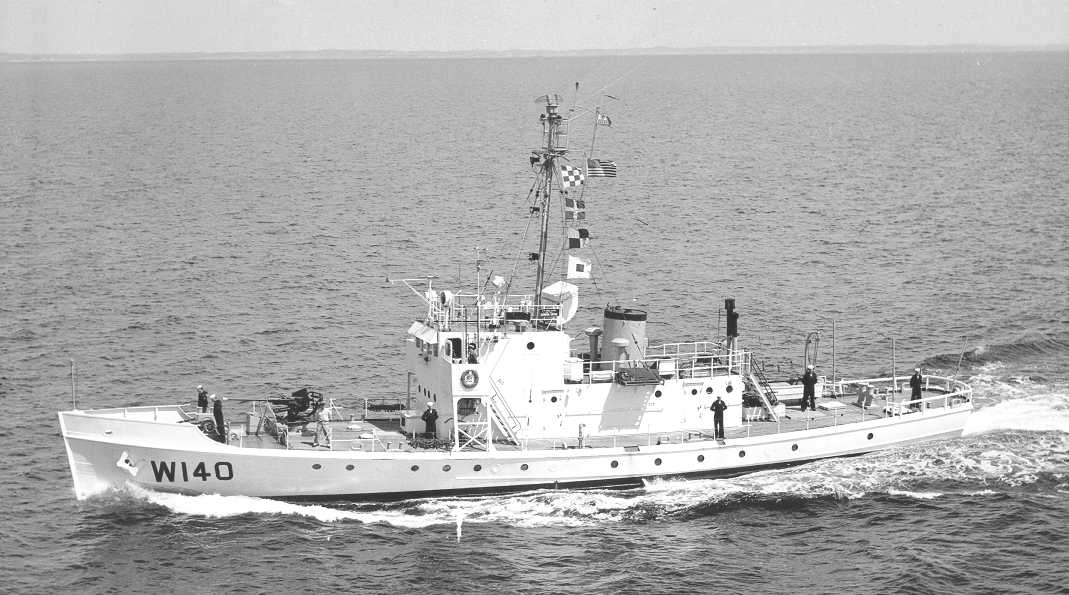
- Active class patrol boat, 1962

History

United States
- Name: Harriet Lane
- Namesake: Harriet Lane
- Launched: 30 November 1926
- Commissioned: 1927
- Decommissioned: 29 April 1946
- Fate: Sold into merchant service and renamed MV Humble, 1949

General characteristics
- Class & type: Active-class patrol boat
- Displacement: 220 t (220 t)
- Length: 125 ft (38 m)
- Beam: 23 ft 6 in (7.16 m)
- Draft: 9 ft (2.7 m)
- Propulsion: Diesel engines; twin screws
- Speed: 13 kn (15 mph)
- Complement: 5 officers 41 enlisted
- Armament: 1 × 3 in (76 mm)/23 caliber gun; 2 × 20mm anti-aircraft guns; 2 × depth charge racks; 2 × mousetraps

USCGC Harriet Lane (WSC-141) was a 125-foot patrol boat, commonly known as a "buck-and-a-quarter", 1926–1946.

She was the first ship named for the USRC Harriet Lane. She was based in Boston, Provincetown and Gloucester, Massachusetts. In 1941, the cutter served in World War II, and after for the Fifth Coast Guard District, home ported in Norfolk, Virginia. She was decommissioned in 1946, and became the merchant vessel Humble AC-4 in 1949.

== Bibliography ==
- Flynn, Jim; Lortz, Ed; Lukas, Holger (March 2018). "Answer 39/48". Warship International. LV (January 2018): 23–25. ISSN 0043-0374.
- "USCGC Harriet Lane (WMEC 903)". United States Coast Guard. Retrieved 5 July 2014.
