= USCGC Vigilant (WPC-154) =

Patrol boat of the United States Coast Guard

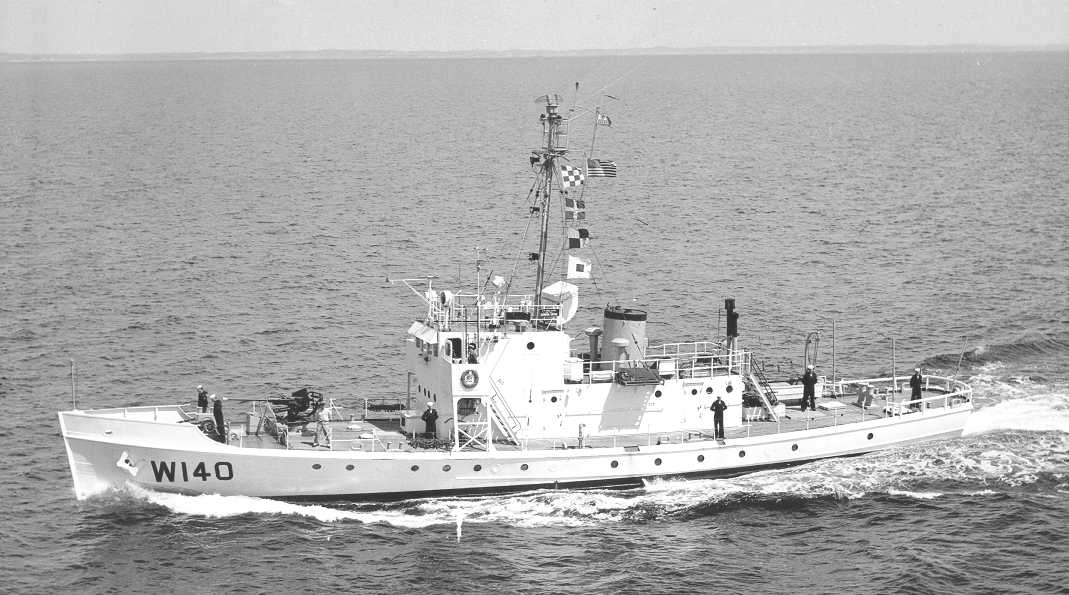
- Active class patrol boat, 1962

History

United States
- Name: USCGC Vigilant
- Builder: American Brown Boveri Electric Corporation, Camden, New Jersey
- Launched: 25 April 1927
- Commissioned: 3 May 1927
- Decommissioned: 1966
- Fate: Sold in 1966

General characteristics
- Class & type: Active-class patrol boat
- Displacement: 232 tons
- Length: 125 feet
- Beam: 23.5 feet
- Draft: 7.5 feet
- Propulsion: 2 x 6-cylinder, 300 hp engines
- Speed: Maximum: 13 knots, 1945; Cruise: 8.0 knots
- Range: 3,500 miles; Max. Speed: 2,500 miles
- Complement: 3 officers, 17 men (1960)
- Armament: 1927: 1x 3"/27 1941: 1 x 3 in (76 mm)/23, 2 x depth charge tracks; 1945: 1 x 40 mm Bofors/80 (single), 2 x 20 mm Oerlikon/80 (single), 2 x depth charge tracks, 2 x mousetraps; 1960: 1 x 40mm/60

USCGC Vigilant (WPC-154) was an Active-class patrol boat of the United States Coast Guard. She was 125-foot, steel-hulled, twin-screw, diesel-powered cutter primarily outfitted for Aids to Navigation work. On the night of 24 January 1931, she was involved in the chase and capture of Canadian rum-running schooner Josephine K, which was captured off of New York Harbor with a cargo of whisky valued at $100,000 confiscated. The crew was exonerated on 31 January of blame by a Coast Guard board of inquiry in the death of the captain of the Josephine K, who was mortally wounded by a one-pound shot during the chase.

WPC-154 was involved in the rescue of survivors of several U-boat attacks off central Florida in the 1940s.

== Bibliography ==
- Flynn, Jim; Lortz, Ed; Lukas, Holger (March 2018). "Answer 39/48". Warship International. LV (January 2018): 23–25. ISSN 0043-0374.
