= USCGC Alert =

USCGC Alert can refer to the following ships of the United States Coast Guard:

- USCGC Alert (WMEC-127), was a United States Coast Guard Cutter launched in 1926 that remained in service until January 1969, she sank on October 31, 2021.
- USCGC Alert (WMEC-630), is a United States Coast Guard Cutter that entered service in August 1969 and remains in service.
