= USCGC Crawford =

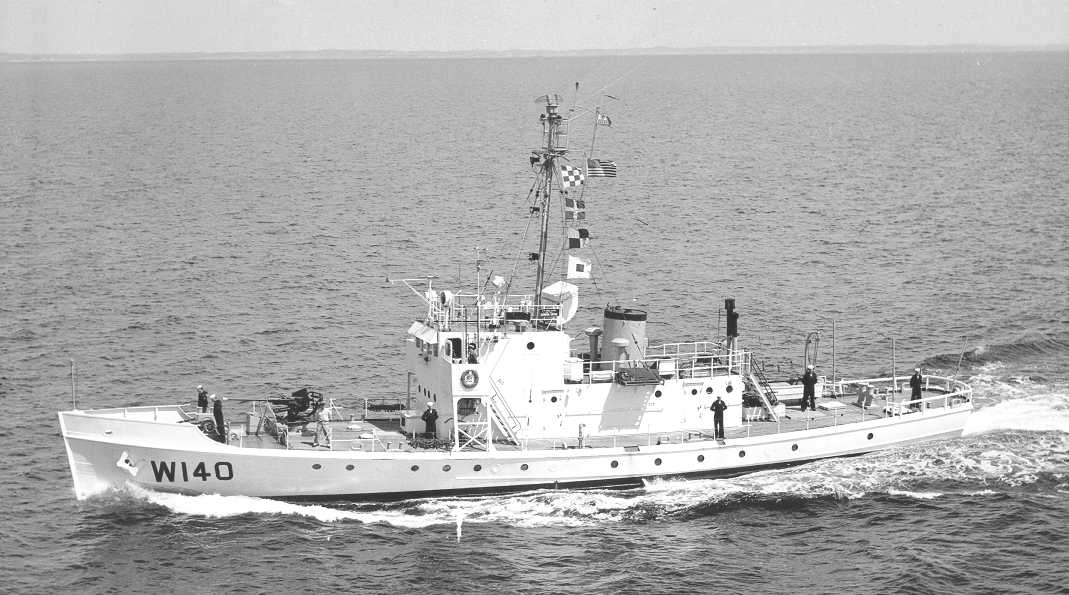
- Active class patrol boat, 1962

History

United States
- Name: USCGC Crawford
- Namesake: William H. Crawford, 7th United States Secretary of the Treasury
- Operator: U.S. Coast Guard
- Builder: American Brown Boveri Electric Corporation, Camden, New Jersey
- Cost: US$63,163
- Launched: 27 January 1927
- Commissioned: 21 February 1927
- Decommissioned: 15 August 1947
- Fate: Donated to Woods Hole Oceanographic Institution; 28 November 1955.

General characteristics
- Class & type: Active-class patrol boat
- Displacement: 232 tons (trial)
- Length: 125 ft (38 m)
- Beam: 23 ft 6 in (7.16 m)
- Draft: 7 ft 6 in (2.29 m)
- Installed power: After 1938 re-engining: 1,200 brake horsepower (0.9 megawatt)
- Propulsion: As built: Two 6-cylinder 300 brake horsepower diesel engines; After 1938 re-engining: Two 800 brake horsepower General Motors diesel engines
- Speed: As built: 10 knots; In 1945: 12 knots (maximum); 7 knots (economical)
- Range: In 1945: 2,900 nautical miles (5,370 kilometers) at 10 knots; 4,000 nautical miles (7,400 kilometers) at 7 knots
- Complement: 20 (3 officers, 17 enlisted men) (1930); 46 (5 officers, 41 men) (1945)
- Sensors & processing systems: Sonar (1945) QCO-1; Detection radar (1960) SPS-23
- Armament: In 1927: 1 x 3-inch (76.2-millimeter) 23-caliber gun; In 1941: 2 x depth charge tracks; In 1945: 1 x 3-inch (76.2-mm) 23-caliber gun, 2 x single 20-mm 80-caliber gun mounts, 2 x depth charge tracks, 2 x Mousetraps1 x 3-inch (76.2-mm) 23-caliber gun1 x 3-inch (76.2-mm) 23-caliber gun; In 1960: 1 x single 40-mm 60-caliber antiaircraft gun mount

USCGC Crawford (WSC-134), was a 125 ft (38 m) United States Coast Guard Active-class patrol boat in commission from 1927 to 1947. She was named for William H. Crawford, (1772–1834) who was appointed in 1816 as Secretary of the Treasury by President James Madison and he continued under President James Monroe through 1825. Crawford was the seventh vessel commissioned by the U.S. Revenue Cutter Service and the Coast Guard named after the former secretary. She served during the Rum Patrol and World War II performing defense, law enforcement, ice patrol, and search and rescue missions.

== Construction and commissioning ==
Crawford was built by American Brown Boveri Electric Corporation at Camden, New Jersey and she was commissioned as USCGC Crawford (WSC-145) on 21 February 1927. She was the seventh of the Active-class patrol boats to be commissioned, which were designed for trailing the "mother ships" that supported the smuggling boats of "rum-runners" during Prohibition. The Active-class ships were also referred to unofficially as the "Buck & a Quarter" class in reference to their 125 ft (38 m) length.

== Patrol duties during the Depression ==
Crawford had been designed specifically for prohibition enforcement service and assumed Rum Patrol duty 27 March 1927 with a temporary home-port of Sault Sainte Marie, Michigan and later a permanent station on 28 September 1927 at Two Harbors, Minnesota. Her routine consisted of picketing liquor laden "mother ships" and preventing them from offloading prohibited cargo to smaller contact boats that were used to deliver liquor to shore. With the end of prohibition, she assumed a more traditional role of a Coast Guard cutter, that of search and rescue, law enforcement, merchant vessel inspection, and defense training. (Note: The repeal of Prohibition was accomplished with the ratification of the Twenty-first Amendment on 5 December 1933.) In 1937, Crawford was assigned the home-port of Buffalo, New York. In mid-1941 Crawford was converted for use to service aids-to-navigation due to a shortage of buoy tenders but was later transferred to U.S. Navy control with patrol duties out of Philadelphia, Pennsylvania and reconfigured as a sub-chaser.

== World War II service ==
Crawford performed patrol duties out of Philadelphia but was later transferred to San Juan, Puerto Rico, where she performed wartime anti-submarine patrols and convoy escort duty with the Navy Caribbean Sea Frontier Squadron. On 5 June 1944 she is credited with the rescue of survivors from a sunken merchant vessel. On 30 June she took in tow the torpedoed tanker SS Unimak.

== Post-war service ==
Crawford was reassigned duties out of the Tenth Coast Guard District in June 1945 was released from Navy service on 1 January 1946. Crawford was decommissioned on 15 August 1947 and was donated to Woods Hole Oceanographic Institution 28 November 1955.

== Woods Hole Oceanographic Institution ==
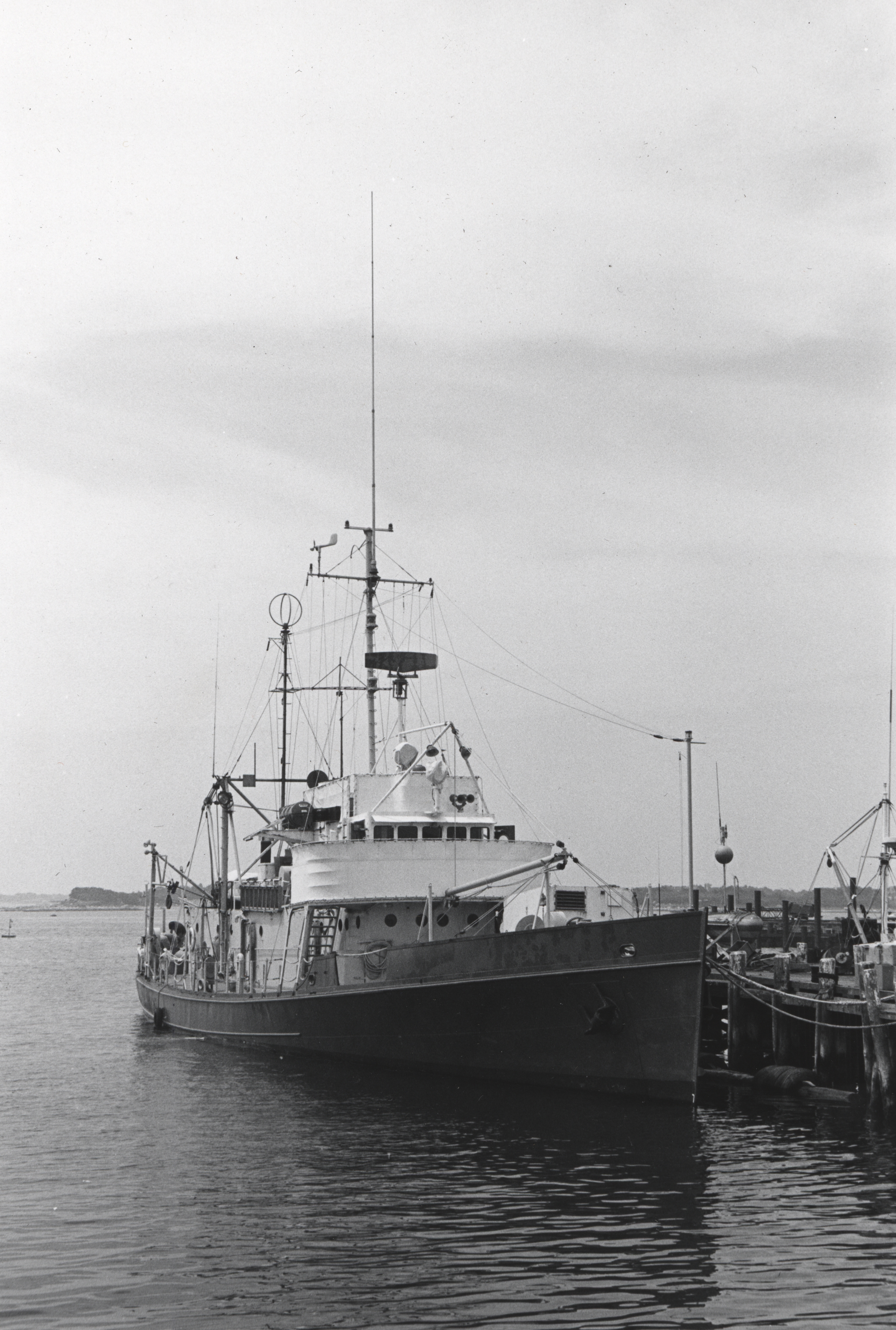
R/V Crawford at Woods Hole Oceanographic Institution

After Crawford was transferred to Woods Hole Oceanographic Institution she underwent a renovation at Munro Shipyard at Boston, Massachusetts to increase her fuel capacity. She worked in both North and South Atlantic Ocean waters and was mainly used for working on hydrographic stations, long line fishing studies and in surveying sites for Texas towers. R/V Crawford made a total of 175 cruises for Woods Hole. Her capacity was 17 crew and 9 scientists. In 1970 she was sold to the University of Puerto Rico.

== Later history ==
On 13 May 1986 USCGC Manitou stopped the 125 ft (38 m) M/V Sun Bird in Seventh District waters and her boarding team discovered 40,000 lb (18,000 kg) of marijuana hidden aboard. The boarding team then located the vessel's builder's plate and learned that the Sun Bird was the decommissioned "buck-and-a-quarter" cutter Crawford. The former cutter and her 14-man crew were taken into custody. A newspaper article describing the incident noted:

If Crawford was a person, Miami would have probably seen it blush . . . The ex-Coast Guard cutter received more publicity for smuggling the drugs than for its 20-year Coast Guard career. (Note: It is not apparent from references used in the article when Crawford was disposed of by the University of Puerto Rico or to who she was transferred.)

== See also ==
Rum Patrol
