= USCGC Alert (WMEC-127) =

Coordinates: 45.615684°N 122.678918°W

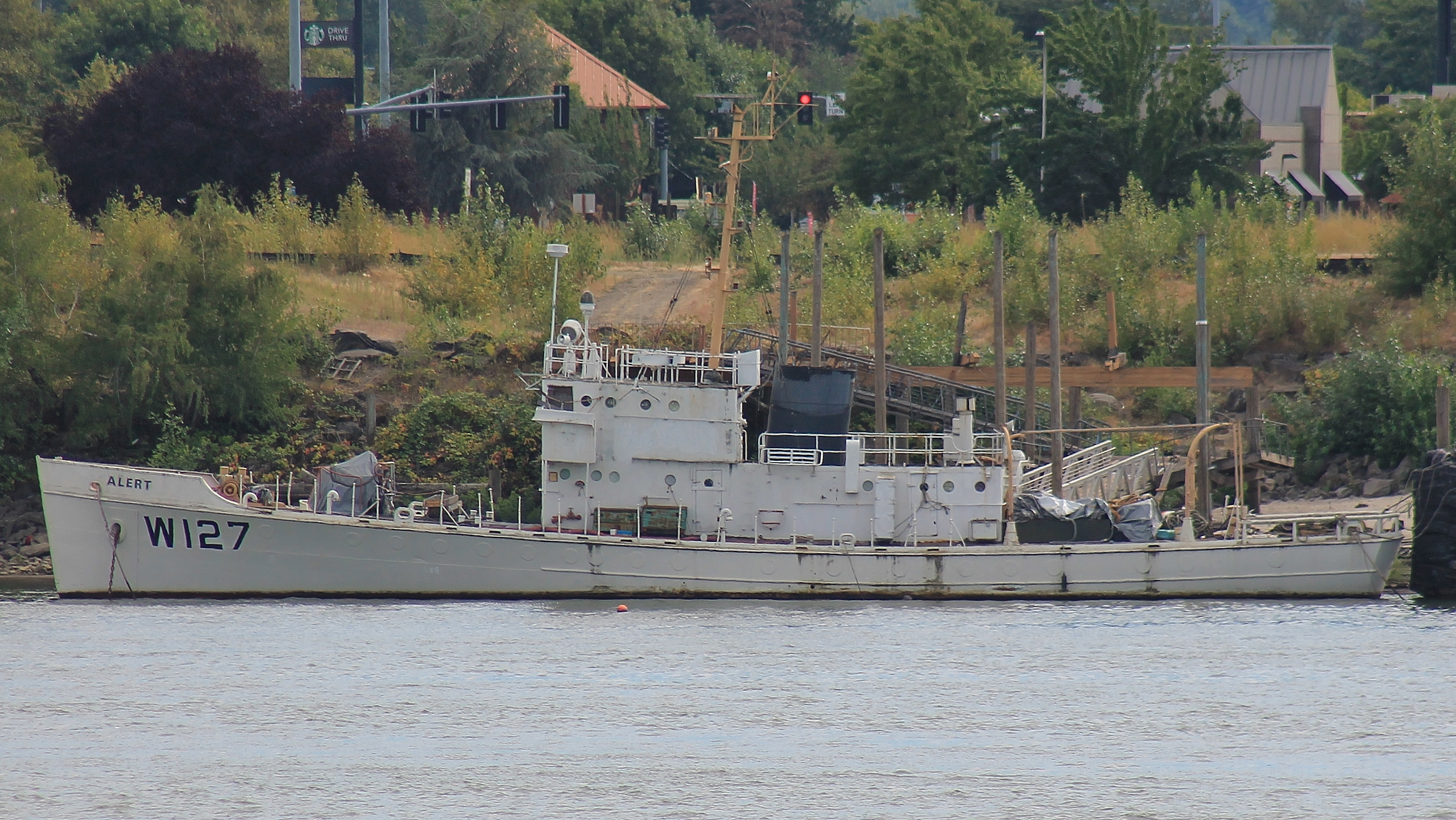
- Alert seen moored in Portland, Oregon in 2019.

History

United States
- Builder: American Brown Boveri Electric Corporation, Camden, NJ
- Launched: 30 November 1926
- Commissioned: 27 January 1927
- Decommissioned: 10 January 1969
- Identification: IMO number: 7516931; Callsign: WZU9399
- Fate: Sunk 31 October 2021

General characteristics
- Class & type: Active-class patrol boat
- Displacement: 232 tons
- Length: 125 feet
- Beam: 23.5 feet
- Draft: 7.5 feet
- Propulsion: 2 x 6-cylinder, 300 hp engines
- Speed: Maximum: 13 knots, 1945; Cruise: 8.0 knots
- Range: 3,500 miles; Max. Speed: 2,500 miles
- Complement: 3 officers, 17 men (1960)
- Armament: 1927: 1x 3"/27 1941: 1 x 3 in (76 mm)/23, 2 x depth charge tracks; 1945: 1 x 40 mm Bofors/80 (single), 2 x 20 mm Oerlikon/80 (single), 2 x depth charge tracks, 2 x mousetraps; 1960: 1 x 40mm/60

USCGC Alert (WMEC-127) was a United States Coast Guard medium endurance cutter and was the fourth cutter to carry the name. She was launched on 30 November 1926, commissioned 27 January 1927, and finally decommissioned 10 January 1969. The ship was brought to Portland, Oregon in 2006 and moored at Hayden Island with plans to turn it into a museum ship. Walt James, the founder of the nonprofit Columbia Watershed Environmental Advocates had planned to restore it but died before that could occur and the group was waived of responsibility for it, according to the U.S. Coast Guard.

While moored at Hayden Island, the Alert was part of a growing homeless encampment, named the "Pirates of the Columbia", due to criminal activity along the waterfront. The ship was heavily damaged by graffiti and stripped of parts. In December 2020, the encampment was broken up and the dock to the Alert removed. On the night of 31 October 2021, the Alert sank at her mooring off of Hayden Island. No cause was determined.

Metro Council, a regional government agency that serves three counties in northwest Oregon, spent $2 million to have the ships removed, and the Coast Guard added more than $1 million for the cleanup. The Alert was slated to be removed in October 2022.

== Bibliography ==
- Flynn, Jim; Lortz, Ed; Lukas, Holger (March 2018). "Answer 39/48". Warship International. LV (January 2018): 23–25. ISSN 0043-0374.
