= USCGC Agassiz =

United States Coast Guard patrol boat

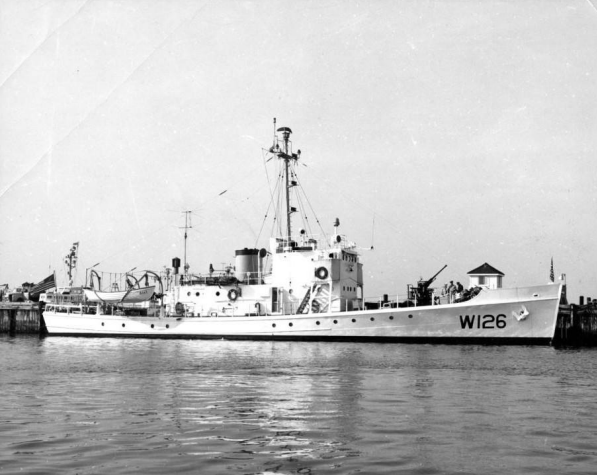
- USCGC Agassiz in 1957 at Cape May, New Jersey

History

United States
- Name: USCGC Agassiz
- Operator: United States Coast Guard United States Navy
- Builder: American Brown Boveri Electric Corporation, Camden, New Jersey
- Cost: $63,163 USD
- Way number: Yard #321
- Laid down: 24 July 1926
- Launched: 30 November 1926
- Acquired: Delivered 19 January 1927
- Commissioned: 12 January 1927
- Decommissioned: 13 October 1969
- In service: 1927
- Out of service: 1969
- Reclassified: 1 May 1966
- Stricken: 13 October 1969
- Fate: Transferred to the United States Merchant Marine Academy

General characteristics
- Class & type: Active-class patrol boat
- Displacement: 232 tons (trial)
- Length: 125 ft (38 m)
- Beam: 23 ft 6 in (7.16 m)
- Draft: 7 ft 6 in (2.29 m)
- Propulsion: 2 × 6-cylinder, 300 hp (220 kW) engines
- Speed: As built: 10 knots (19 km/h; 12 mph)
- Range: 3,500 nmi (6,500 km; 4,000 mi) At max. speed: 2,500 nmi (4,600 km; 2,900 mi)
- Complement: 3 officers, 17 men at launch; 22 (1938); 38 (1944)
- Armament: In 1927: 1 × 3-inch (76 mm) 27-caliber gun; In 1941: 1 × 3-inch (76 mm) 23-caliber gun, 2 × depth charge tracks, 10 x depth charges

USCGC Agassiz (WSC-126) later WMEC-126, was a steel hulled, single screw Active-class patrol boat of the United States Coast Guard which served between 1927 and 1969.

== Design ==
USCGC Agassiz (WSC-126) was the second of 35 ships in the Active class, designed to serve as a "mother ship" in support of Prohibition against bootleggers and smugglers along the coasts. These ships would shadow and pursue large smuggling vessels away from American shores. They were meant to be able to stay at sea for long periods of time in any kinds of weather, and were able to expand berthing space via hammocks of the need arises, such as if a large amount of survivors were on board.

She was built by the American Brown Boveri Electric Corporation of Camden, New Jersey at a cost of $63,163. The cutter was laid down on 24 July 1926 as yard number 321 and launched on 30 November 1926 from slipway L. The ship was commissioned on 12 January 1927. Like the rest of her class, she was 125 feet (38 m) long, had a 22-foot-6-inch (6.86 m) beam and a 7-foot-6-inch (2.29 m) draft. A single 3-inch (76 mm) gun was mounted as the offensive weapon as launch.

Agassiz was named for Jean Louis Rodolphe Agassiz, a paleontologist, glaciologist, geologist and naturalist who taught at the University of Neuchâtel, Switzerland and Harvard University, Massachusetts.

== Ship history ==
After being commissioned on 12 January 1927, Agassiz was stationed at Boston as part of Division One, Squadron One of the Offshore Patrol Force, Boston with five other cutters. On 1 August 1933 the ship operated from Fernandina, Florida as part of the Jacksonville Division. In 1936 she was attached to Curtis Bay, Maryland, and during 1940 she operated out of Charleston, South Carolina. She was assigned to the Caribbean Sea Frontier [CARIBSEAFRON] during the Second World War. On 12 March 1942 the cutter saved 11 survivors from the torpedoed tanker SS John D. Gill. Once the war ended the vessel was sent to Morehead City, North Carolina until 1956. In January 1956 the Agassiz aided in the disabled Manitou 275 miles (443 km) southeast of Cape Henry, Virginia. Another unnamed merchant vessel was aided 40 miles (64 km) east off Cape Fear, Virginia the same month. The homeport was changed to Cape May, New Jersey in 1956. The ship was redesignated from WSC, Coast Guard Submarine Chaser, to WMEC-126, Coast Guard Medium Endurance Cutter. The grounded Septic Nerve was aided by Agassiz off Little Egg Inlet on 18 October 1961. The disabled Canadian fishing vessel Clara and Linda was aided 160 miles (260 km) east of New York in 1967 during a storm. The fishing vessel Bright Star was escorted to safety 25 miles (40 km) southeast of Cape May on 1 March 1968.

The Agassiz was decommissioned and struck from Coast Guard service on 13 October 1969 and was transferred to the United States Merchant Marine Academy on 16 October 1969 as the vessel Agassiz #607283. The ship's fate after being transferred is unknown.
