= USCGC Reliance (WSC-150) =

Patrol boat in the US Coast Guard

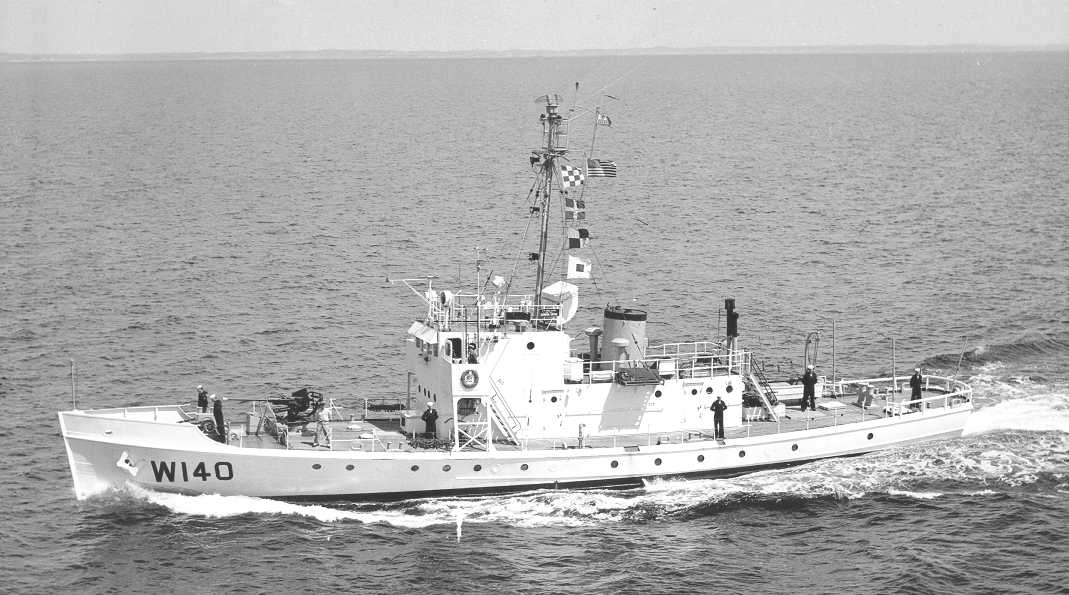
- Sister ship USCGC General Greene

History

United States
- Name: Reliance
- Owner: United States Coast Guard
- Builder: American Brown Boveri Electric Corp., Camden, New Jersey
- Launched: 4 April 1927
- Commissioned: 26 April 1927
- Decommissioned: 8 August 1947
- Out of service: 8 August 1947
- Identification: WSC-150
- Fate: Sold for scrap, 16 June 1948

General characteristics
- Class & type: Active-class patrol boat
- Displacement: 232 tons
- Length: 125 ft (38.1 m)
- Beam: 23.6 ft (7.2 m)
- Draft: 7.6 ft (2.3 m)
- Propulsion: 2 x 6-cylinder, 300 hp (220 kW) engines
- Speed: 13 knots (24 km/h; 15 mph)
- Range: 2,500 miles at 13 kn
- Complement: 3 officers, 17 men
- Armament: 1 x 3"/27 caliber gun at launch, 2 depth charge racks were added during World War II

USCGC Reliance (WSC-150) was a 125-foot (38 m) steel-hulled single-screw Active-class patrol boat of the United States Coast Guard. She served from 1927 to 1948.

== Design ==
USCGC Reliance (WSC-150) was one of the 35-ship Active class, designed to serve as a "mother ship" in support of Prohibition against bootleggers and smugglers along the coasts. The ship was built with the intention to follow and shadow smuggling vessels to push them away from American shores. They were meant to be able to stay at sea for long periods of time in any kinds of weather, and were able to expand berthing space via hammocks if the need arose, such as if a large amount of survivors were on board. She was built by the American Brown Boveri Electric Corporation of Camden, New Jersey, at a cost of $63,173. The cutter was launched on 18 April 1927 and commissioned on 26 April 1927. Like the rest of her class, she was 125 feet (38 m) long, with a 22-foot-6-inch (6.86 m) beam and a 7-foot-6-inch (2.29 m) draft. A single 3-inch (76 mm) gun was mounted as the offensive weapon at launch.

== Service history ==
From commissioning to October 1928, the vessel performed patrol and rescue operations in the New York City Area. The ship was than reassigned to Stapleton, New York to patrol the lower New York Bay through May 1933. On 22 May 1933 she was transferred to Norfolk, Virginia to continue duties. At an unknown date in late 1935, she was stationed to Pearl Harbor, Territory of Hawaii. Reliance inspected the French Frigate Shoals in March 1936. The ship was transferred to the United States Navy under Executive Order 8929 of 1 November 1941.

=== Second World War service and loss of USS S-28 ===
Reliance was operating out of Honolulu, Hawaii at the outbreak of World War II and was subsequently assigned to search and rescue duties at the base in Cordova, Alaska. Off the coast of Johnston Island, Reliance depth charged a submarine contact in the spring of 1944. On 3 July 1944 the ship and submarine USS S-28 engaged in target practice. The submarine acted as a target for anti-submarine vessels until 1700 local time. The next day S-28 conducted sonar and torpedo passes on the cutter. At 1730 the submarine dived four miles (6.4 km) from Reliance before contact was lost. No detectable signs of distress were found. At 1830 communication was attempted to be established without success. Former tests have shown gear noise should be heard up to 2,000 yards (1,800 m) out, yet contact was not established. At 2000 other vessels from Pearl Harbor were contacted, and a search initiated. The only sign found was an oil slick before the search was called off during afternoon of 6 July 1944. A Court Inquiry investigated the sinking found the vessel sank at 1820 on 4 July 1944 in 1,400 fathoms (8,400 ft; 2,600 m) of water, without a cause being identified. Reliance was returned to the Department of the Treasury on 1 January 1946 and served with the Coast Guard until it was decommissioned on 8 August 1947. The vessel was sold 16 June 1948 with possible use as a civilian fishing ship off Alaska.
