= USCGC General Greene =

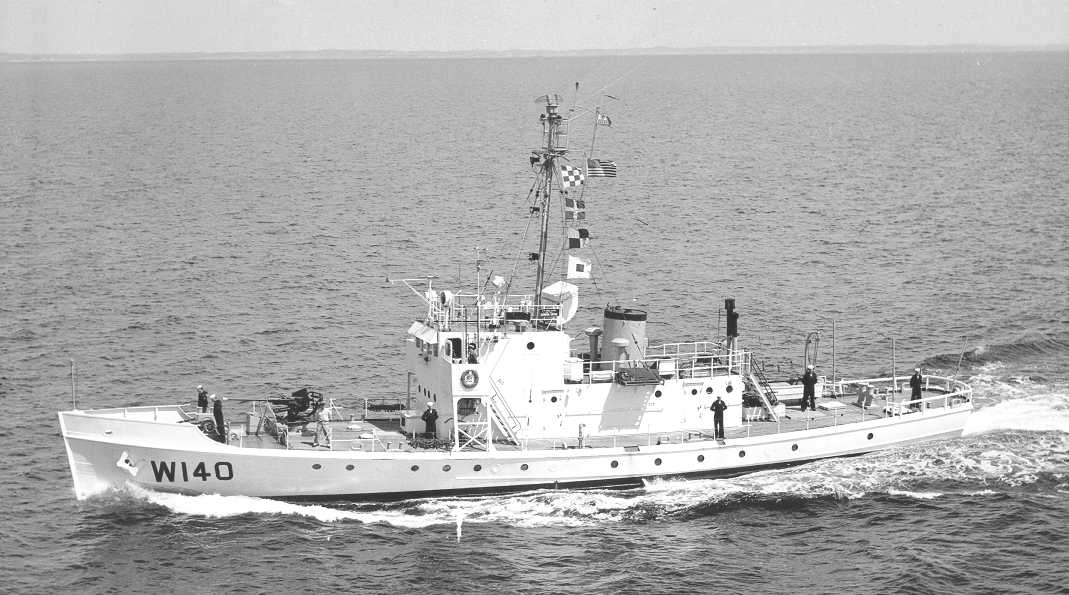
- USCGC General Greene, 1962

History

United States
- Name: USCGC General Greene (WPC-140/WSC-140)
- Namesake: Nathanael Greene, American Revolutionary War general
- Builder: American Brown Boveri Electric Corporation, Camden, New Jersey
- Cost: $90,000 USD
- Launched: 14 February 1927
- Commissioned: 7 April 1927
- Decommissioned: 15 November 1968
- Fate: Sold, 1976

General characteristics
- Type: Patrol boat
- Displacement: 232 long tons (236 t)
- Length: 125 ft (38 m)
- Beam: 23 ft 6 in (7.16 m)
- Draft: 7 ft 6 in (2.29 m)
- Propulsion: 2 × 8-cylinder, 268A General Motors 850 hp late 1950s to decommission300 hp (224 kW) engines
- Speed: 1945; Maximum: 13 knots (24 km/h; 15 mph); Cruise: 8 kn (15 km/h; 9.2 mph) 8-268A Max speed 19kn cruise 12.5kn
- Range: 3,500 nmi (6,500 km; 4,000 mi); At max. speed: 2,500 nmi (4,600 km; 2,900 mi)
- Complement: 3 officers, 17 men (1960)
- Armament: 1927: 1 × 3"/27 caliber gun; 1941: 1 × 3"/23 caliber gun; 2 × depth charge tracks; 1945: 1 × 40 mm/80 gun; 2 × 20 mm/80 guns; 2 × depth charge tracks; 2 × Mousetrap ASW; 1960: 1 × 40 mm/60 gun

USCGC General Greene (WPC/WSC/WMEC-140), was a 125 ft (38 m) United States Coast Guard Active-class patrol boat, in commission from 1927 to 1968 and the fourth cutter to bear the name of the famous Revolutionary War general, Nathanael Greene. She served during the Rum Patrol, World War II and into the 1960s performing defense, law enforcement, ice patrol, and search and rescue missions.

== Construction and commissioning ==
The General Greene was built by the American Brown Boveri Electric Corp. of Camden, New Jersey, at a cost of $90,000. (Note: Scheina (1982) says $63,173 USD.) She was launched on 14 February 1927, and commissioned on 7 April 1927.

== Patrol duties during the Depression ==
General Greene had been designed specifically for prohibition enforcement service and assumed Rum Patrol duty 15 May 1927 with a home-port of Boston, Massachusetts Her routine consisted of picketing liquor laden "mother ships" and preventing them from offloading prohibited cargo to smaller contact boats that were used to deliver liquor to shore. On 15 March 1931 she departed Boston bound for St. John's, Newfoundland to join the International Ice Patrol for the first time. At the end of the patrol season she would return to Boston and resume Rum Patrol duties; this pattern would continue through the end of the 1933 Ice Patrol season. With the end of prohibition in 1933, General Greene assumed a more traditional role of a Coast Guard cutter, that of search and rescue, law enforcement, merchant vessel inspection, and defense training. (Note: The repeal of Prohibition was accomplished with the ratification of the Twenty-first Amendment on 5 December 1933.) In 1941 she conducted an oceanographic survey off the coast of Newfoundland and while on the survey in May 1941, she was ordered to search for survivors from two British freighters torpedoed off the coast of Greenland. She recovered 39 survivors from the SS Marconi, and observed part of the Royal Navy task force engaging the Bismarck.

== World War II service ==
In early 1942 she was re-designated WSC-140, and assigned to search and rescue and convoy escort duties. On 25 May 1942 she engaged a German U-boat with depth charges in a dense fog off Nantucket Shoals while rescuing survivors from the British freighter SS Peisander.

== Post-war service ==
In 1946 she returned to her station at Woods Hole, and from 1947 until her decommissioning in 1968 was based at Gloucester, Massachusetts.

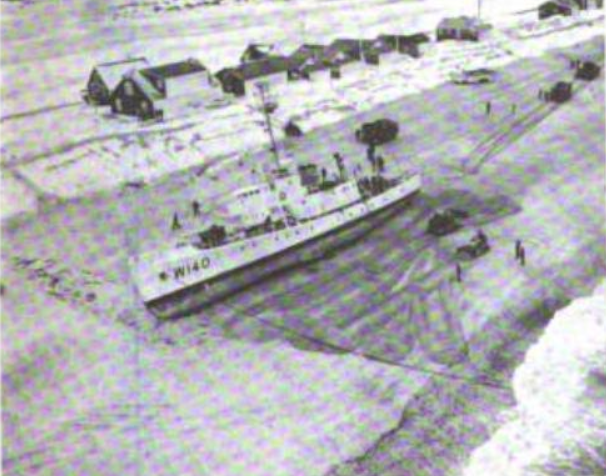
General Greene aground on Spring Hill Beach at East Sandwich, Massachusetts, sometime between 4 and 8 March 1960. Bulldozers are creating a trough for use in refloating her at high tide.

While attempting to assist a tug in distress, General Greene was swept ashore on Spring Hill Beach at East Sandwich, Massachusetts, by hurricane-force winds and 40-foot (12 m) waves on 4 March 1960. All hands were rescued and the ship was refloated on 8 March 1960.

After her decommissioning, General Greene was transferred to Newburyport, Massachusetts, for use as a museum ship, but she was returned to the Coast Guard in 1976 and sold. In 1979, renamed Belmont and under the flag of Guatemala, she was seized by the Coast Guard for drug smuggling.

== Awards ==
- American Defense Service Medal with "A" device
- American Campaign Medal
- World War II Victory Medal
- National Defense Service Medal with star

== See also ==
Rum Patrol
