= Oregon Inlet Station =

- U.S. National Register of Historic Places
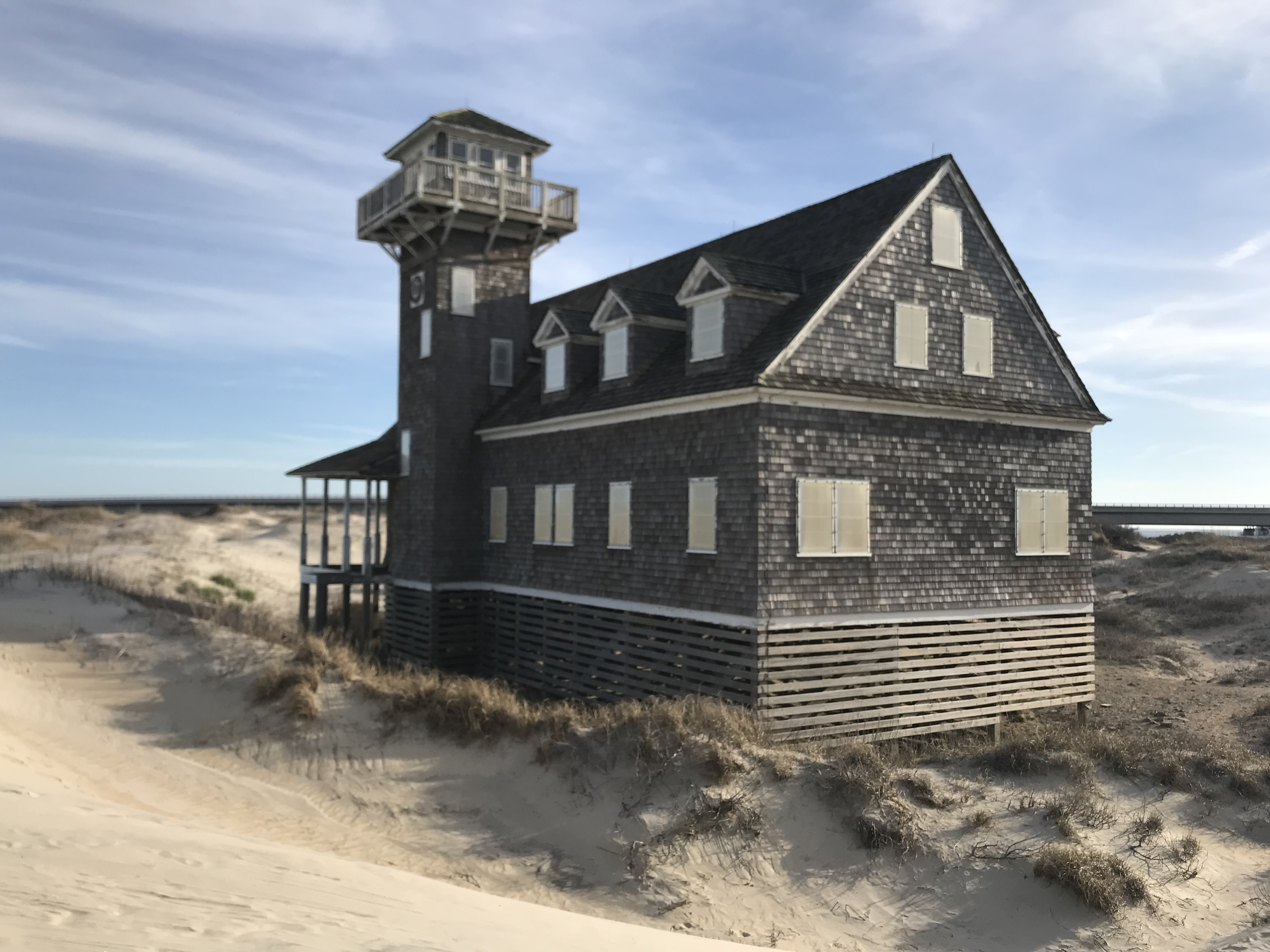

- Location within North Carolina Location within the United States
- Location: 12 miles N of Rodanthe on Pea Island, near Rodanthe, North Carolina
- Coordinates: 35°46′06″N 75°31′28″W
- Area: 10 acres (4.0 ha)
- Built: 1897
- Built by: US Life Saving Service
- Architectural style: Shingle Style
- NRHP reference No.: 75001253
- Added to NRHP: December 23, 1975

Oregon Inlet Station is a historic lifesaving station located near Rodanthe, Dare County, North Carolina. It was built in 1897 by the United States Life-Saving Service and remodeled in 1933 and 1970. It is a 1 1/2-story, Shingle Style rectangular frame building with a lookout tower. It has a porch that surrounds the building. It was one of seven lifesaving stations established on the Outer Banks of North Carolina in 1874, to serve the ships that were lost in the treacherous waters off the North Carolina coast.

It was listed on the National Register of Historic Places in 1975.
