= USCGC Jackson =

United States Coast Guard cutter

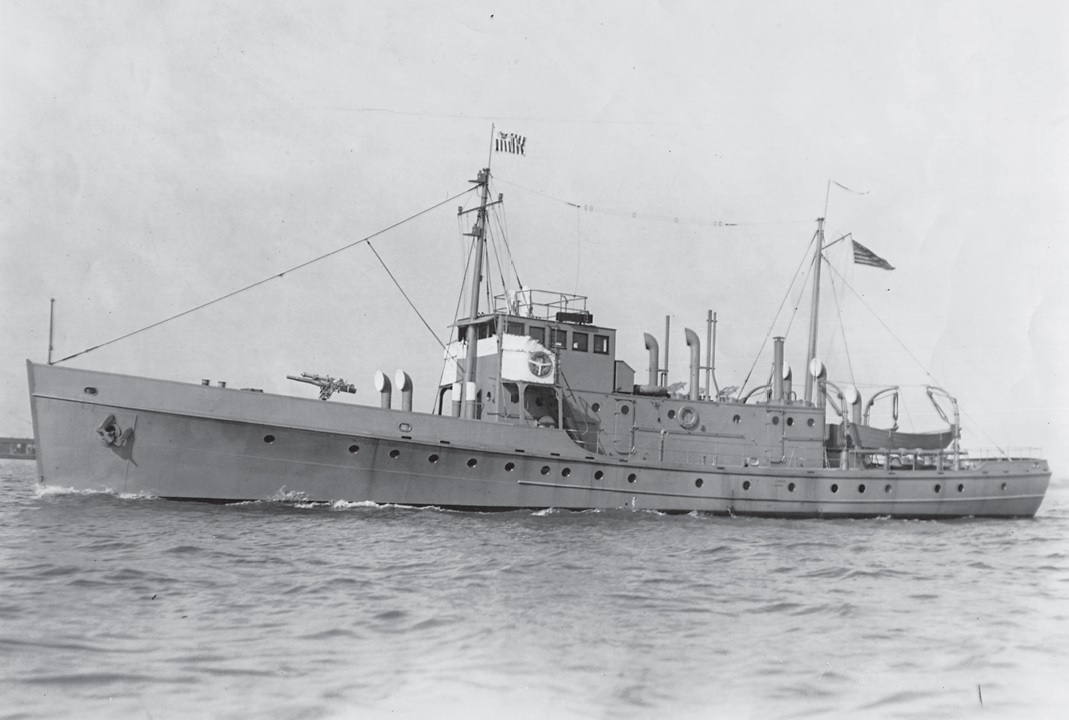
- USCGC Jackson on 31 March 1927 on the Delaware River

History

United States
- Name: USCGC Jackson
- Operator: United States Coast Guard
- Builder: American Brown Boveri Electric Corporation, Camden, New Jersey
- Cost: US$63,163
- Launched: 14 February 1927
- Commissioned: 14 March 1927
- Reclassified: February 1942
- Homeport: USCG Station Boston, later USCG Station Rochester and Morehead City, North Carolina
- Fate: Capsized in storm in 1944
- Notes: Location: 35°54'7.61"N, 75°23'42.47"W (35.902116, -75.395133) In 77 ft (23 m) of water USCGC Jackson (North Carolina)

General characteristics
- Class & type: Active-class patrol boat
- Displacement: 232 tons (trial)
- Length: 125 ft (38 m)
- Beam: 23 ft 6 in (7.16 m)
- Draft: 7 ft 6 in (2.29 m)
- Propulsion: 2 × 6-cylinder, 300 hp (220 kW) engines
- Speed: As built: 10 knots (19 km/h; 12 mph) (maximum); 8 knots (15 km/h; 9.2 mph) (economical)
- Range: 3,500 nmi (6,500 km; 4,000 mi) At max. speed: 2,500 nmi (4,600 km; 2,900 mi)
- Complement: 22 (1938); 38 (1944)
- Armament: In 1927: 1 × 3 in (76 mm) 27-caliber gun; In 1941: 1 × 3-inch (76 mm) 23-caliber gun, 2 × depth charge tracks, 10 × depth charges

USCGC Jackson (WSC-142) was an Active-class cutter of the United States Coast Guard. She capsized in 1944, killing twenty one of her forty crew members.

== Design and construction ==
USCGC Jackson (WSC-142) was the 18th of 35 ships in the Active class, designed to serve as a "mother ship" in support of Prohibition against bootleggers and smugglers along the coasts. They were meant to be able to stay at sea for long periods of time in any kinds of weather, and were able to expand berthing space via hammocks of the need arises, such as if a large amount of survivors were on board. Built by the American Brown Boveri Electric Corporation of Camden, New Jersey, she was laid down on 2 December 1927. The cutter was launched on 14 February 1927 and commissioned exactly one month later. Like the rest of her class, she was 125 feet (38 m) long, had a 22-foot-6-inch (6.86 m) beam and a 7-foot-6-inch (2.29 m) draft. A single 3-inch (76 mm) gun was mounted as the offensive weapon at launch.

== Service history ==
Jackson was first assigned to USCG Station Boston to serve out her designated role along the New England Coast. After prohibition ended in 1933, she was deployed to U.S. Coast Guard Station Rochester in the Great Lakes. Here, the vessel was attached to conduct more routine operations, such as search and rescue, fisheries patrols, and law enforcement. As the Second World War worsened, she was once again reassigned to the East Coast under the Eastern Sea Frontier (EASTSEAFRON) of the United States Navy. The name and hull numbers were kept. In February 1942, her class was redesignated from WPC as a coast guard cutter to WSC, or coast guard sub chaser. Jackson joined the war effort by escorting vessels and convoys, conducting crew and ship rescues and serving in anti-submarine patrols. She was refitted with a heavier main gun, deck gear, and depth charges in the late 1930s. These changes had the effect of making the ship more top-heavy, making it easier to capsize. Between her return to the East Coast and her sinking, she operated from Morehead City, North Carolina.

== Sinking and rescue ==
On 14 September 1944, Jackson was instructed to rendezvous with the cutter USCGC Bedloe and the tug USS Escape to assist in the towing of the Liberty ship SS George Ade which had been torpedoed by the German submarine U-518 and driven ashore in a storm. After arriving in the area near the Outer Banks, weather conditions quickly deteriorated to hurricane conditions throughout the morning. fifty-mile-per-hour (80 km/h) winds forced the ship to close all hatches and secure deck equipment. This included disarming the depth charges, which may have avoided accidental discharge. Known as the Great Hurricane of 1944, the storm reportedly brought waves up to 100–125 feet (30–38 m). Maneuverability and communications became much more difficult and the ship was thrown around. Large swells began to lift the ship to its crest before immediately dropping the vessel to its trough about 100 feet below. The first two of such waves caused the ship to crash into the water, causing it to list 60 and 110 degrees respectively. The situation got to the point where the mast was temporarily submerged in sea water. After being hit by a similar wave, the listing ship failed to self right and immediately capsized at around 10:30 AM. Thirty seven crew members were able to successfully abandon ship, but the high winds and waves scattered survivors and repeatedly flipped rafts. Ironically, the crew of Jackson believed they would soon be rescued by sister ship Bedloe, not knowing she sank two and a half hours after theirs in similar conditions. The crew of Bedloe likewise believed the same about being rescued by Jackson, not knowing its situation. An additional seventeen crew members later died from exposure to the elements or exhaustion over the next 58 hours. The remaining twenty would also endure survival in shark-infested waters before being saved. Two crew members attempted to swim to shore ten miles (16 km) away, but gave up three hours later after negligible progress. Their raft was spotted by a Coast Guard aircraft operating from Elizabeth City, North Carolina. Rescue aircraft began landing along the crew members as United States Navy blimps dropped emergency food and coordinated a rescue. A third 38-foot cutter from Oregon Inlet Lifeboat Station picked up survivors to be transferred to a navy minesweeper before being hospitalized.

== Wreck ==
At some point after sinking the ship broke in two, the wreck settled southeast of Nags Head, North Carolina in 77 feet (23 m) of water. In perfect conditions, it can be seen up to 40 feet (12 m) away. The ship now rests several hundred feet (roughly 100 meters) away from the wreck of a landing craft and that of MV Advance II.

== Legacy ==
In total, 47 guardsmen would lose their lives in the twin sinkings, including 21 on Jackson. No bodies from the incident were recovered. After the sinking, the United States Navy transferred the then USS PCE(R)-858 to the United States Coast Guard where it was renamed USCGC Jackson (WPC-120) to cover the loss on 28 February 1946. Due to lack of crew, the new ship was berthed at Curtis Bay, Maryland until her decommissioning on 23 December 1947.

== Gallery ==
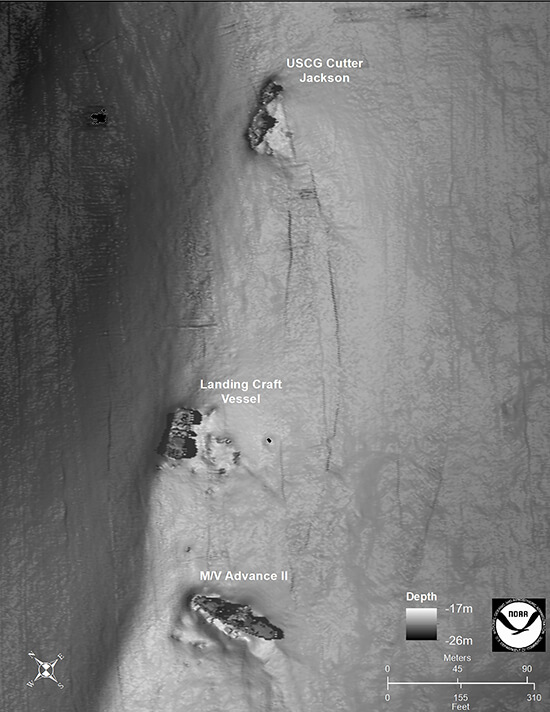
Location of the Jackson's wreck, and its proximity to other vessels

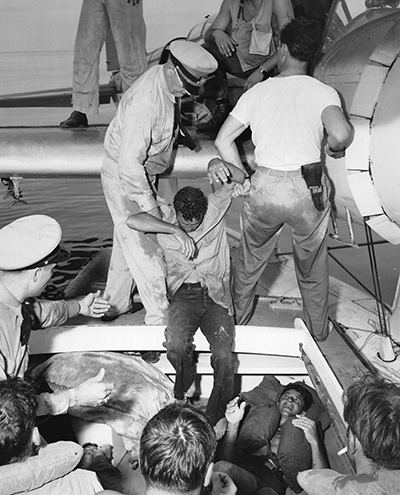
The crew of USCGC Jackson are rescued by an amphibious aircraft, after being adrift for 58 hours.

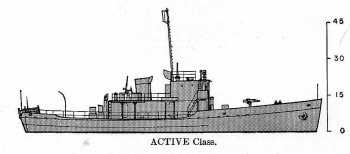
Recognition drawing of the Active class as seen in World War II. From Office of Naval Intelligence Recognition handbook 222 (ONI-222).

== See also ==
- Rogue wave
