= USCGC Bedloe =

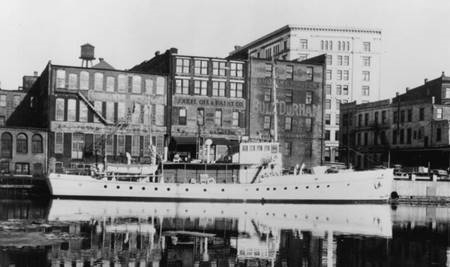
- USCGC Antietam, later Bedloe in 1930

History

United States
- Name: Bedloe
- Operator: United States Coast Guard United States Navy
- Port of registry: Morehead City, North Carolina, United States
- Builder: American Brown Boveri Electric Corporation, Camden, New Jersey
- Cost: $63,163 USD
- Launched: 14 February 1927
- Commissioned: 27 July 1927
- In service: 1927-1944
- Reclassified: February 1942
- Home port: USCG Station Boston, later Milwaukee, Wisconsin and Staten Island
- Identification: Code letters: NRLC
- Fate: Capsized in a storm in 1944
- Notes: Location: 35°43.853'N, 75°5.210'W (35.73089, -75.08684) In 140 ft (43 m) of water USCGC Bedloe (North Carolina)

General characteristics
- Class & type: Active-class patrol boat
- Displacement: 232 tons (trial)
- Length: 125 ft (38 m)
- Beam: 23 ft 6 in (7.16 m)
- Draft: 7 ft 6 in (2.29 m)
- Propulsion: 2 × 6-cylinder, 300 hp (220 kW) engines
- Speed: As built: 10 knots (19 km/h; 12 mph) (maximum); 8 knots (15 km/h; 9.2 mph) (economical) After refit: Max: 13 knots (24 km/h; 15 mph); 8 knots (economical)
- Range: 3,500 nmi (6,500 km; 4,000 mi) At max. speed: 2,500 nmi (4,600 km; 2,900 mi)
- Complement: 41
- Armament: In 1927: 1 x 3 in (76 mm)/27-caliber gun; In 1941: 1 x 3 in/23-caliber gun, 2 x depth charge tracks

USCGC Antietam (WSC-128), later Bedloe was an Active-class cutter of the United States Coast Guard where she was commissioned from 1927 to 1944. She sank in 1944, killing 26 crewmembers.

== Design and construction ==
USCGC Antietam (WSC-142) was the fourth of 35 ships in the Active class, designed to serve as a "mothership" in support of Prohibition against bootleggers and smugglers along the coasts. They were meant to be able to stay at sea for long periods of time in any kinds of weather, and were able to expand berthing space via hammocks of the need arises, such as if a large amount of survivors were on board. Built by the American Brown Boveri Electric Corporation of Camden, New Jersey, she was laid down on 2 December 1927. The cutter was launched on 14 February 1927 and commissioned on 27 July 1927. Like the rest of her class, she was 125 feet (38 m) long, had a 22 feet 6 inches (6.86 m) beam and a 7 ft 6 in (2.29 m) draft.

== Service history ==
After being commissioned, the than Antietam was stationed to USCG Station Boston to enforce Prohibition and other laws, along with standard search and rescue duties. After Prohibition ended, she was reassigned to Milwaukee, Wisconsin in the Great Lakes sometime during 1935. Here, she participated in conduct more routine operations, such as search and rescue, fisheries patrols, and law enforcement. As the Second World War worsened, she was refitted in Hoboken, New Jersey and equipped with a heavier main gun and depth charges at the Tietjen & Lang plant in 1940. After her refit, she was transferred to the Eastern Sea Frontier (EASTSEAFRON) of the US Navy to bolster military presence in the region to operate from Stapleton, Staten Island. In February 1942, she was redesignated from WPC as a coast guard cutter to WSC, or coast guard submarine chaser. The vessel served as a convoy escort along the United States East Coast during a majority of a war. On 9 March 1942, Antietam and the minesweeper USS Larch rescued 16 survivors from the T2 tanker SS Gulf Trade after it was torpedoed by the submarine U-588 three miles (4.8 km) off the coast of New Jersey. On 1 June 1943, she was renamed to USCGC Bedloe to avoid confusion with the aircraft carrier of the same name, Antietam (CV-36).

== Sinking ==
On 14 September 1944, Bedloe was instructed to rendezvous with the cutter USCGC Jackson and tug USS Escape to assist in the towing of the Liberty ship SS George Ade which had been torpedoed by the German submarine U-518 and driven ashore in a storm. After arriving in the area near the Outer Banks, weather conditions quickly deteriorated to hurricane conditions throughout the morning. Known as the Great Hurricane of 1944, the storm reportedly brought waves up to 100–125 feet (30–38 m). The weather blocked any form of communication or radar being used, meaning Bedloe could not send or receive messages about her condition. Maneuverability was also limited because the storm had created a situation where the rudder failed to move the ship, requiring an engine to spin down to turn.

The ship was suddenly hit by four waves in quick succession, throwing the ship from the crest of one wave to the trough of the next. The vessel quickly foundered at around 1:30 PM. All 38 crewmembers were able to successfully abandon ship, but only 30 obtained a hold on a life raft. The still present hurricane and Portuguese men-of-war, a jellyfish-like species, harassed survivors throughout the day and into the night. The crew of Bedloe believed they would soon be rescued by sister ship Jackson, not knowing she sank two and a half hours earlier than theirs in similar conditions. The crew of Jackson likewise believed the same about being rescued by Bedloe, not knowing its situation. Lieutenant A. S. Hess, the commanding officer explained why the crew thought that. He said, "Skippers often think alike. I was trying to work our way out to sea a bit to avoid the heavy swell hitting near the shore and I figured the Jackson was doing likewise and would be somewhere in the vicinity." Only 12 crewmembers survived the ordeal, one man going under minutes before rescue aircraft came into view. The other 26 passed from either exhaustion or exposure to the elements over the 51 hours they were in the water. A Coast Guard patrol plane spotted rafts from the two lost vessels, with survivors being transported to a navy minesweeper before being sent to Norfolk.

The original mission for Bedloe, to tow George Ade into port, succeeded in the sense that the ship suffered minimal damage and no casualties.

== Wreck ==
After sinking, Bedloe came to rest in 144 feet (44 m) of water, about 22 miles (35 km) east of the Outer Banks in North Carolina. The ship is almost completely intact, laying on its side. The depth charges on board were never jettisoned prior to sinking, yet are missing from the site. It is believed the US Navy removed the weapons after it went down. On site visibility ranges from 20 to 40 feet (6.1 to 12.2 m), condition dependent. The ship itself is covered in sea life, and a bulkhead has given away, allowing divers to look into the ship.

== Legacy ==
In total, 47 Coast Guardsmen would lose their lives in the twin sinkings, including 26 on Bedloe. Four bodies total were recovered, all from this vessel. After the sinking, the United States Navy transferred the then USS PCE-860 to the United States Coast Guard where it was renamed Bedloe (WPC-121) to cover the loss on 18 September 1946. Due to lack of crew, the new ship was berthed at Curtis Bay, Maryland until her decommissioning on 17 July 1947.

== Gallery ==
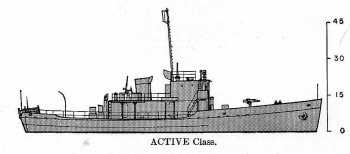
The US Office of Naval Intelligence recognition image for the Active-class cutter during 1943.

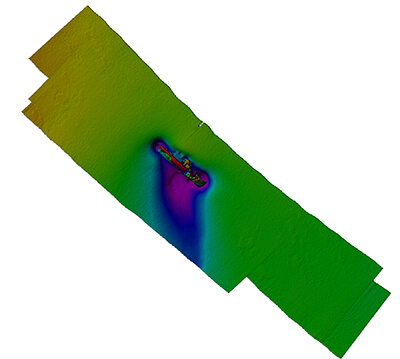
A scan of Antietam's wreck off North Carolina. Taken by the US NOAA ship Nancy Foster.
