= Mousetrap (weapon) =

American anti-submarine weapon system

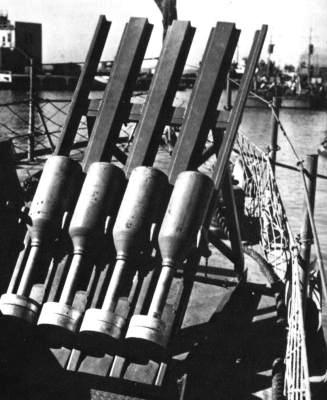
4-missile Mark 20 anti-Submarine Projector

Mousetrap (anti-Submarine Projector, Marks 20 and 22) was an anti-submarine rocket launcher used mainly during World War II by the United States Navy and Coast Guard. Its development began in 1941 as a replacement for Hedgehog anti-submarine mortar. Hedgehogs were spigot-launched, which placed considerable strain on the launching vessel's deck, whereas Mousetrap was rocket-propelled. As a result, Mousetrap's four or eight rails for 7.2-inch (183 mm) rockets saved weight and were easier to install.

The rockets weighed 65 pounds (29 kg) each, with a 33-pound (15 kg) Torpex warhead and contact pistol, exactly like Hedgehog.

By the end of the war, over 100 Mark 22 Mousetraps were mounted in US Navy ships, including three each on 12 destroyers, and submarine chasers (usually two sets of rails).

== Statistics ==
- Round weight: 65 lb (29 kg)
- Warhead: 33 lb (15 kg)
- Range: about 280 m (920 ft)
- Firing speed: one round every 3 seconds (maximum)
- No. of rails:
  - Mark 20: 4
  - Mark 22: 8

== Bibliography ==
- Fitzsimons, Bernard, ed. (1978). "Mousetrap". The Illustrated Encyclopedia of Twentieth Century Weapons and Warfare. Vol. 18. London: Phoebus Publishing. pp. 1946–1947. OCLC 271437802.
