= List of shipwrecks in 1979 =

The list of shipwrecks in 1979 includes ships sunk, foundered, grounded, or otherwise lost during 1979.

table of contents
1979
Jan	Feb	Mar	Apr
May	Jun	Jul	Aug
Sep	Oct	Nov	Dec
Unknown date

== January ==
=== 1 January ===
List of shipwrecks: 1 January 1979
Ship	State	Description
Ocean Cape	United States	The 80-foot (24.4 m) crab-fishing vessel sank in the Gulf of Alaska approximately 22 nautical miles (41 km; 25 mi) from Cape Fairweather (58°48′30″N 137°56′45″W) on the south-central coast of Alaska. The tug Stalwart (United States) rescued her four survivors from a life raft on 5 January.

=== 6 January ===
List of shipwrecks: 6 January 1979
Ship	State	Description
Two unidentified warships	Khmer Rouge	Battle of Ream: The warships were sunk by the corvettes HQ-05 and HQ-07 (both Vietnam People's Navy).

=== 7 January ===
List of shipwrecks: 6 January 1979
Ship	State	Description
Unidentified warship	Khmer Rouge	Battle of Ream: The warship was sunk by the patrol boats T-208 and T-215 (both Vietnam People's Navy).

=== 8 January ===
List of shipwrecks: 8 January 1979
Ship	State	Description
Betelgeuse	France	The tanker exploded and sank in Bantry Bay, Ireland, with the loss of 50 lives.

=== 10 January ===
List of shipwrecks: 10 January 1979
Ship	State	Description
Two unidentified warships	Khmer Rouge	The warships were sunk by the corvette Pham Ngu Lao and the patrol boats HQ-03, T-197, T-199, T-203 and T-205 (all Vietnam People's Navy) off Ream, Cambodia.

=== 19 January ===
List of shipwrecks: 19 January 1979
Ship	State	Description
Glacier Queen	United States	The floating hotel's wreck – refloated after sinking at anchor in November 1978 in Seldovia Bay (59.4274°N 151.7249°W) in Cook Inlet on the south-central coast of Alaska – was scuttled in 12,000 feet (3,700 m) of water in the Gulf of Alaska 100 nautical miles (190 km; 120 mi) west of Cape Saint Elias on the southwestern tip of Alaska's Kayak Island after being towed out to sea by the salvage tug Salvage Chief (United States).

== February ==
=== 6 February ===
List of shipwrecks: 6 February 1979
Ship	State	Description
Edna B	United States	The crab-fishing vessel was destroyed by fire in the Gulf of Alaska 25 nautical miles (46 km; 29 mi) south of Seward, Alaska. Her crew of four reached a cabin on the south-central coast of Alaska on the shore of Driftwood Bay (59°56′N 149°13′W), where one of them died. The cutter USCGC Cape Jellison ( United States Coast Guard) rescued the three survivors on 11 February.

=== 14 February ===
List of shipwrecks: 14 February 1979
Ship	State	Description
François Vieljeux	France	The container ship foundered in rough seas 45 nautical miles (83 km) south west of Cape Finisterre with the loss of 23 lives.
Home	United States	The 33-foot (10.1 m) sailboat was wrecked on the southern tip of Long Island in the Alexander Archipelago in Southeast Alaska southwest of Ketchikan, Alaska. The family of four on board survived on shore in the wilderness for over a month, suffering severe frostbite and hypothermia, before being rescued.
Revi	Panama	She foundered 2.5 nautical miles (4.6 km) (53°39′N 0°23′E) off the Humber Lightship (United Kingdom).

=== 19 February ===
List of shipwrecks: 19 February 1979
Ship	State	Description
Renown	United States	The 86-foot (26.2 m) crab-fishing vessel burned and sank without loss of life in the Gulf of Alaska approximately 15 nautical miles (28 km; 17 mi) south-southeast of Sitkinak Island in the Kodiak Archipelago.

=== 28 February ===
List of shipwrecks: 28 February 1979
Ship	State	Description
Alaska Roughneck	United States	The 198-gross register ton, 113.5-foot (34.6 m) or 130-foot (39.6 m) landing craft ran aground and sank near King Cove, Alaska, with the loss of two lives. The fishing vessel Seven Seas (United States) rescued her two survivors.
Sirius	United States	The 72-foot (21.9 m) crab-fishing vessel ran aground on Douglas Reef (58°45′45″N 153°16′00″W) north of Kodiak, Alaska, and was pounded to pieces by the surf. The crab-fishing vessel Polar Star (United States) rescued her entire crew of six.

=== Unknown date ===
List of shipwrecks: Unknown date February 1979
Ship	State	Description
Unnamed drydock barge	United States	The retired 100-foot (30.5 m) drydock barge was scuttled as an artificial reef in the North Atlantic Ocean 3.6 nautical miles (6.7 km; 4.1 mi) off Sea Girt, New Jersey, in 75 feet (23 m) of water at 40°07.759′N 073°56.384′W. Her wreck subsequently was pulverized by a large load of concrete dumped on top of it.

== March ==
=== 7 March ===
List of shipwrecks: 7 March 1979
Ship	State	Description
HDMS Fyen	Royal Danish Navy	The minelayer ran aground off Toftøya, Norway and was damaged. Subsequently repaired and returned to service.

=== 10 March ===
List of shipwrecks: 10 March 1979
Ship	State	Description
Unknown cargo ship	Egypt	A cargo ship was sunk at Hodeidah by Mikoyan-Gurevich MiG-21 aircraft of the South Yemen Air Force.

=== 15 March ===
List of shipwrecks: 15 March 1979
Ship	State	Description
Kurdistan	Liberia	The tanker struck ice in the Cabot Strait which fractured her hull. She subsequently broke in two during a gale. Her crew were rescued by CCGS Sir William Alexander ( (Canada) Canadian Coast Guard). The bow section was sunk on 1 April by HMCS Margaree (Maritime Command); the stern section was towed to a European port where a new bow was constructed. She was returned to service.

=== 16 March ===
List of shipwrecks: 16 March 1979
Ship	State	Description
Pacific Pride	United States	The 80-foot (24.4 m) fishing vessel was destroyed by fire off Harvester Island (57°39′N 154°00′W) in Uyak Bay on the coast of Kodiak Island. The fishing vessel Cougar (United States) rescued her entire crew of four.

=== 29 March ===
List of shipwrecks: 29 March 1979
Ship	State	Description
USCGC Cuyahoga	United States Coast Guard	The wreck of the cutter – sunk in a collision on 20 October 1978 and later refloated – was scuttled in the Atlantic Ocean 15 nautical miles (28 km; 17 mi) off the Virginia Capes to form an artificial reef.

=== 30 March ===
List of shipwrecks: 30 March 1979
Ship	State	Description
Angelina Lauro	Italy	The vessel caught fire at Charlotte Amalie, United States Virgin Islands and sank. Refloated on 2 July.

== April ==
=== 7 April ===
List of shipwrecks: 7 April 1979
Ship	State	Description
City of Seattle	United States	The 84-foot (25.6 m) crab fishing-fishing vessel sank in the Gulf of Alaska 80 nautical miles (150 km; 92 mi) south of Yakutat, Alaska. The United States Coast Guard rescued everyone on board.

=== 18 April ===
List of shipwrecks: 18 April 1979
Ship	State	Description
Joann	United States	The 86-foot (26.2 m) vessel sank off Alaska. The vessel Yankee Clipper (United States) rescued her crew.

=== 20 April ===
List of shipwrecks: 20 April
Ship	State	Description
Galaxy	Honduras	The pirate radio ship, a converted Admirable-class minesweeper, sank at Hamburg, West Germany. She was raised in 1986 and scrapped.

=== 27 April ===
List of shipwrecks: 27 April
Ship	State	Description
Tarek	Cyprus	Lebanese Civil War: The coaster was sunk by limpet mines while at anchor off Tyre, Lebanon.

=== 28 April ===
List of shipwrecks: 28 April 1979
Ship	State	Description
Gino	Liberia	The tanker collided with Team Castor (Norway) and sank in the English Channel. All crew rescued by a Soviet merchant ship.

== May ==
=== 13 May ===
List of shipwrecks: 13 May 1979
Ship	State	Description
R. B. Hendrickson	United States	The fishing vessel ran aground and sank.

=== 16 May ===
List of shipwrecks: 16 May 1979
Ship	State	Description
Zerstörer 1	German Navy	The decommissioned Fletcher-class destroyer was sunk as a target in the Mediterranean Sea by a torpedo fired by the submarine U-29 (German Navy).

=== 17 May ===
List of shipwrecks: 17 May 1979
Ship	State	Description
HMAS Air Sprite	Royal Australian Navy	The decommissioned air-sea rescue vessel was sunk as a target by a RIM-24 Tartar missile fired by the guided-missile destroyer HMAS Brisbane (Royal Australian Navy).

=== 20 May ===
List of shipwrecks: 20 May 1979
Ship	State	Description
Charlotte B	United States	The 80-foot (24.4 m) crab-fishing vessel sank in 27 feet (8.2 m) of water while docked in the small boat harbor at Kodiak, Alaska, pulling some of the dock under with her. She was refloated and scuttled at sea on 13 June.

=== 26 May ===
List of shipwrecks: 26 May 1979
Ship	State	Description
Pillar Cape	United States	While returning from Togiak to Cold Bay, Alaska, the 32-foot (9.8 m) seiner sank off Cold Bay.

== June ==
=== 7 June ===
List of shipwrecks: 7 June 1979
Ship	State	Description
Ham 580	Netherlands	The barge was sunk as a target by South African Air Force Blackburn Buccaneer attack aircraft.
Ham 582	Netherlands	The barge was either scuttled with explosives or sunk as a target by SAS Windhoek, SAS Durban, and SAS Port Elizabeth (all South African Navy).

=== 12 June ===
List of shipwrecks: 12 June 1979
Ship	State	Description
Restless C	United States	The 52-foot (15.8 m) fishing vessel capsized and sank in Hallo Bay on the south coast of the Alaska Peninsula in Alaska, perhaps after colliding with another vessel. Two of her four crewmen were lost; the other two were rescued by the vessel Awtam (United States)
Spirit	United States	The 50-foot (15.2 m) fishing vessel capsized and sank without loss of life in the Gulf of Alaska approximately 6 nautical miles (11 km; 6.9 mi) north of the Barren Islands (58°57′N 152°15′W) off the south-central coast of Alaska.

=== 13 June ===
List of shipwrecks: 13 June 1979
Ship	State	Description
Charlotte B	United States	After sinking on 20 May at her dock in the small boat harbor at Kodiak, Alaska, the 80-foot (24.4 m) crab-fishing vessel was refloated, towed out to sea, and scuttled in the Gulf of Alaska.

=== 18 June ===
List of shipwrecks: 18 June 1979
Ship	State	Description
Regal Sword	Liberia	Carrying a cargo of scrap iron, the bulk carrier sank very quickly in 275 feet (84 m) of water in the Atlantic Ocean off Cape Cod, 25 nautical miles (46 km; 29 mi) southeast of Chatham, Massachusetts, at 41°28′N 069°22′W after colliding in fog with the tanker Exxon Chester (United States). Her entire crew of 38 abandoned ship in her lifeboats and was rescued by Exxon Chester.

=== 21 June ===
List of shipwrecks: 21 June 1979
Ship	State	Description
Petro Bouscat	Senegal	The vessel was stranded in the Sanaga River (3°29′N 9°44′E) and abandoned as a constructive total loss.

=== 26 June ===
List of shipwrecks: 26 June 1979
Ship	State	Description
Lady Fame	United States	A storm destroyed the motor vessel off the south-central coast of Alaska near Cordova.

=== 30 June ===
List of shipwrecks: 21 June 1979
Ship	State	Description
Bunga Kenanga	Malaysia	The ship ran aground in the Kori Creek, India and was abandoned.

== July ==
=== 1 July ===
List of shipwrecks: 1 July 1979
Ship	State	Description
Seasprite	Greece	The cargo ship ran aground in Kori Creek, in the Gulf of Kutch and was a total loss.

=== 3 July ===
List of shipwrecks: 3 July 1979
Ship	State	Description
Kairali	India	The bulk carrier disappeared in the Arabian Sea about 500 nautical miles (930 km) west of Margao, India, after sending a final radio message on this date.

=== 4 July ===
List of shipwrecks: 4 July 1979
Ship	State	Description
Brown Bear	United States	The 86-foot (26.2 m) fish tender burned and sank in Prince William Sound on the south-central coast of Alaska 3 nautical miles (5.6 km; 3.5 mi) south of Glacier Island (60°53′N 147°11′W). The vessels Glacier Queen and Lulubell (both United States) rescued all five people aboard.

=== 5 July ===
List of shipwrecks: 5 July 1979
Ship	State	Description
Hokuto Maru No. 5	Japan	The fishing vessel sank in the Bering Sea southwest of Saint Paul Island with the loss of six lives after colliding with the fish processing vessel Tsuda Maru (Japan). The United States Coast Guard rescued 20 survivors from both vessels.

=== 19 July ===
List of shipwrecks: 19 July 1979
Ship	State	Description
Atlantic Empress	Greece	Collided with Aegean Captain (Greece) off Trinidad and Tobago, causing a large oil spill.
USS Tiru	United States Navy	The decommissioned Balao-class submarine was sunk as a target in the Atlantic Ocean 200 nautical miles (370 km) off Cape Hatteras, North Carolina, at 36°N 73°W by the submarine USS Silversides (United States Navy).

=== 24 July ===
List of shipwrecks: 24 July 1979
Ship	State	Description
Bev Ann	United States	The motor vessel sank in Prince William Sound on the south-central coast of Alaska.

== August ==
=== 3 August ===
List of shipwrecks: 3 August 1979
Ship	State	Description
Atlantic Empress	Greece	Sank in deep water following damage sustained in collision on 19 July.

=== 5 August ===
List of shipwrecks: 5 August 1979
Ship	State	Description
Blue Pacific	United States	The 98-foot (29.9 m) crab-fishing vessel ran aground in Izhut Bay (58°11′N 152°15′W) on the coast of Afognak Island in Alaska's Kodiak Archipelago and was destroyed by the surf. Her crew survived.

=== 13–14 August ===
List of shipwrecks: 11–15 August 1979
Ship	State	Description
Charioteer	United Kingdom	1979 Fastnet race: The sailing yacht sank in a storm during the race from Cowes, England, to Fastnet Rock south of Ireland to Plymouth, England.
Gringo		1979 Fastnet race: The sailing yacht was abandoned and presumably sank in a storm during the race from Cowes, England, to Fastnet Rock south of Ireland to Plymouth, England.
Magic	United Kingdom	1979 Fastnet race: The sailing yacht sank in a storm during the race from Cowes, England, to Fastnet Rock south of Ireland to Plymouth, England.
Polar Bear	United Kingdom	1979 Fastnet race: The sailing yacht sank in a storm during the race from Cowes, England, to Fastnet Rock south of Ireland to Plymouth, England.

=== 26 August ===
List of shipwrecks: 26 August 1979
Ship	State	Description
Quebecois	Canada	The lake freighter ran aground on a mud bank at the entrance to Lake St. Clair due to an electronic malfunction. The vessel was freed after nine hours without suffering significant damage.

=== 27 August ===
List of shipwrecks: 27 August 1979
Ship	State	Description
Shadow V	United Kingdom	The Troubles: The fishing boat was destroyed off Mullaghmore, County Sligo, Ireland, by a bomb planted by the Provisional IRA. Lord Mountbatten of Burma and three other people died in the blast.

=== 31 August ===
List of shipwrecks: 31 August 1979
Ship	State	Description
Almirante Juan Alejandro Acosta	Dominican Navy	The Admiral Juan Alejandro Acosta-class patrol frigate ran aground and was wrecked in the Dominican Republic.

== September ==
=== 6 September ===
List of shipwrecks: 6 September 1979
Ship	State	Description
Scotia Bay	Canada	The ship capsized and sank while overladen, after hauling in a large load of fish. The crew survived.

=== 14 September ===
List of shipwrecks: 14 September 1979
Ship	State	Description
Yakutat	United States	The barge dragged her anchor in the Kaliakh River, was swamped, and sank north of the river and west of Cape Yakataga, Alaska. Two men on board were swept overboard and died; a 15-year-old girl survived by clinging to wreckage in the water all night and swimming to shore in the morning.

=== 19 September ===
List of shipwrecks: 19 September 1927
Ship	State	Description
Austri	Norway	The roll-on/roll-off cargo ship capsized in stormy weather in the Sognefjord and drifted ashore at Byrknesøyna, Norway. Of the nine-man crew, five were lost, while four were rescued by local boats.

=== 20 September ===
List of shipwrecks: 20 September 1979
Ship	State	Description
Mount Sorrel	United Kingdom	The 105.5-foot (32.2 m), 303-ton Oil Field Standby (safety) Vessel, a former trawler, sank in Aberdeen harbor. Refloated on 26 September, repairted and re3turned to service.

=== 21 September ===
List of shipwrecks: 21 September 1979
Ship	State	Description
HDMS Spækhuggeren	Royal Danish Navy	The Delfinen-class submarine capsized at Copenhagen. Subsequently repaired and returned to service.

=== 23 September ===
List of shipwrecks: 23 September 1979
Ship	State	Description
Transilvania	Romania	The passenger ship capsized at Galaţi. She was declared a constructive total loss.

=== 24 September ===
List of shipwrecks: 24 September 1979
Ship	State	Description
Angelina Lauro	Italy	The retired passenger liner sank in the Pacific Ocean while under tow to shipbreakers in Taiwan

=== 29 September ===
List of shipwrecks: 29 September 1979
Ship	State	Description
HDMS Springeren	Royal Danish Navy	The Delfinen-class submarine partly sank at Copenhagen.

=== Unknown date ===
List of shipwrecks: Unknown date September 1979
Ship	State	Description
USS Ozark	United States Navy	USS Ozark aground Hurricane Frederic: The decommissioned mine countermeasures support ship, serving as a target ship for Eglin Air Force Base's Eastern Gulf test Range, dragged anchor and was driven aground near Perdido Key, Florida. She was salvaged and returned to service as a target ship.

== October ==
=== 6 October ===
List of shipwrecks: 6 October 1979
Ship	State	Description
Harder	United States	The 48-foot (14.6 m) vessel sank near Kodiak, Alaska. The charter vessel Ten Bears (United States) rescued her crew.

=== 8 October ===
List of shipwrecks: 9 October 1979
Ship	State	Description
Angel Marie	United States	The shrimp-fishing vessel was blown onto rocks in Chugach Bay (59°11′N 151°34′W) on south coast of Alaska's Kenai Peninsula and broke up in the surf. Her crew of two survived.

=== 12 October ===
List of shipwrecks: 12 October 1979
Ship	State	Description
USS Alfred A. Cunningham	United States Navy	The decommissioned Allen M. Sumner-class destroyer was sunk as a target by five laser-guided bombs in the Pacific Ocean off the coast of Southern California.

=== 13 October ===
List of shipwrecks: 13 October 1979
Ship	State	Description
Lady Sarah	United States	The 86-foot (26.2 m) fishing vessel sank in the Bering Sea near Akutan Island in the Aleutian Islands. The fishing vessels Sea Wolf and Ocean Leader (both United States) rescued her crew.

== November ==
=== 4 November ===
List of shipwrecks: 4 November 1979
Ship	State	Description
Aeolian Sky	Greece	The ship sank off St Aldhelm's Head after collision with Anna Knueppell (West Germany) the previous day.

=== 6 November ===
List of shipwrecks: 6 November 1979
Ship	State	Description
Pool Fisher	United Kingdom	The ship sank off the Isle of Wight. Thirteen of the fifteen on board were killed.

=== 8 November ===
List of shipwrecks: 8 November 1979
Ship	State	Description
Ryoto Maru No. 2	Japan	During a storm, the factory trawler was wrecked without loss of life in Village Cove (57.12531°N 170.28517°W) near Tolstoi Point (57°07′40″N 170°16′40″W) on Saint Paul Island in the Pribilof Islands. A United States Navy explosive ordnance disposal detachment and United States Coast Guard personnel later demolished the wreck with explosives and thermite grenades as part of a post-wreck clean-up.

=== 10 November ===
List of shipwrecks: 10 November 1979
Ship	State	Description
The Showboat Mayflower	United States	The former sidewheel paddle steamer — formerly the 184-foot (56 m), 728-gross register ton passenger ship and excursion steamer Mayflower, aground since the 1940s on Nantasket Beach at Hull, Massachusetts, to serve as the nightclub "The Showboat Mayflower" — was destroyed by fire.

=== 14 November ===
List of shipwrecks: 14 November 1979
Ship	State	Description
El Lobo del Mar	United States	The motor vessel sank off Juneau, Alaska.
Pelican	United States	The barge ran aground in Chichagof Bay (55°01′30″N 131°58′50″W) on the southeast coast of Prince of Wales Island in the Alexander Archipelago in Southeast Alaska. She later broke up during a storm.

=== 15 November ===
List of shipwrecks: 15 November 1979
Ship	State	Description
Independenţa	Romania	The crude oil tanker collided with the motor vessel Evriali (Greece) and sank with the loss of 43 crew.

=== 23 November ===
List of shipwrecks: 23 November 1979
Ship	State	Description
Hellion	United States	The 38-gross register ton, 59-foot (18.0 m) crab-fishing vessel disappeared during a storm near Dutch Harbor, Alaska, with the loss of her entire crew of three.

=== 24 November ===
List of shipwrecks: 24 November 1979
Ship	State	Description
Ocean Pride	United States	The fishing vessel sank in the Bering Sea.

=== 30 November ===
List of shipwrecks: 30 November 1979
Ship	State	Description
Daylight	United States	The 37-foot (11.3 m) troller was blown onto rocks, capsized, and sank in a gale in Seven Fathom Bay (56°47′30″N 135°18′45″W) in Southeast Alaska 18 nautical miles (33 km; 21 mi) south of Sitka, Alaska. A United States Coast Guard helicopter rescued the two men aboard.

=== Unknown date ===
List of shipwrecks: Unknown date 1979
Ship	State	Description
Berge Vanga	Liberia	The ship sank in the South Atlantic with the loss of all 40 crew.
Jayawang	Singapore	The vessel sank off Bangkok, Thailand.

== December ==
=== 1 December ===
List of shipwrecks: 1 December 1979
Ship	State	Description
Nickel Ferry	Panama	Caught fire at La Unión, El Salvador and declared an irrecoverable total wreck.

=== 5 December ===
List of shipwrecks: 5 December 1979
Ship	State	Description
Salinta	Canada	The badly damaged 33-foot (10.1 m) gillnet fishing vessel was found washed ashore at Tree Point (54°48′15″N 130°55′45″W) in Southeast Alaska. She had departed Prince Rupert, British Columbia, Canada, on 2 December for a day trip to Portland Inlet on the coast of British Columbia, but had not returned. All three adults (a man and two women) and seven children (three boys and four girls) on board were lost.

=== 6 December ===
List of shipwrecks: 6 December 1979
Ship	State	Description
Malmi		The cargo ship capsized and sank in the Baltic Sea 40 nautical miles (74 km; 46 mi) northeast of Gotska Sandön after her cargo shifted in heavy weather.
Norrona	United States	The herring packing vessel heeled over and sank in a few minutes after her stern became submerged in heavy seas 3 nautical miles (5.6 km; 3.5 mi) off North Cape (56°35′45″N 135°08′15″W) near Whale Bay (56.6192°N 135.0000°W) on the southwest coast of Baranof Island in the northern Alexander Archipelago in Southeast Alaska. The fishing vessel Lazaria (United States) rescued her entire crew of three.

=== 14 December ===
List of shipwrecks: 14 December 1979
Ship	State	Description
Caroline of Leigh	United Kingdom	The Moody 36 yacht sank three miles (4.8 km) off Lulworth, Dorset while heading for Bordeaux, France with the loss of four lives.

=== 16 December ===
List of shipwrecks: 16 December 1979
Ship	State	Description
Heye P	West Germany	The vessel was driven ashore in a gale at Prawle Point, Devon, United Kingdom and wrecked.

=== 18 December ===
List of shipwrecks: 18 December 1979
Ship	State	Description
Columbia	United States	The 105-foot (32.0 m) vessel sank at Unalaska in the Aleutian Islands with the loss of one life.

=== 19 December ===
List of shipwrecks: 19 December 1979
Ship	State	Description
Arctic Wind	United States	The 117-foot (35.7 m) fishing vessel sank in Kalekta Bay (53.9780°N 166.3292°W) on coast of Unalaska Island in the Aleutian Islands. She was salvaged in June 1980, repaired, and returned to service.
Rough Draft	United States	The fishing vessel was wrecked in Southeast Alaska in the vicinity of Inian Island (58°15′N 136°19′W) near Elfin Cove, Alaska. Both members of her crew perished.

=== 20 December ===
List of shipwrecks: 20 December 1979
Ship	State	Description
Ulysses	Panama	The coaster was driven ashore near Naples, Italy. She was a total loss.

=== 24 December ===
List of shipwrecks: 24 December 1979
Ship	State	Description
E. M. Ford	United States	The 428-foot (130.5 m) cement carrier broke free from her mooring lines and sank after striking a dock in Milwaukee, she was raised and returned to service.

=== 25 December ===
List of shipwrecks: 25 December 1979
Ship	State	Description
Lee Wang Zin	Panama	After departing Prince Rupert, British Columbia, Canada, with a cargo of 30,000 tons of Bleached Kraft Pulp and a Taiwanese crew of 30 aboard, the 741-foot (225.9 m) bulk carrier capsized with the loss of all hands in a storm in Dixon Entrance on the Canada-United States border between British Columbia and Alaska, possibly after running aground on Celestial Reef. Her overturned hull drifted 25 nautical miles (46 km; 29 mi) and ran aground in Kendrick Bay (54.8741667°N 132.01°W) on Prince of Wales Island in the Alexander Archipelago in Southeast Alaska on 27 December. The United States Coast Guard later attempted to tow her out to sea and scuttle her in deep water, but the towline broke 9 miles (14 km) south of Forrester Island and she sank in 1,000 feet (300 m) of water.

=== 26 December ===
List of shipwrecks: 26 December 1979
Ship	State	Description
Lindblad Explorer	Panama	The cruise ship ran aground off Wiencke Island, Antarctica. Later refloated and returned to service.

=== 30 December ===
List of shipwrecks: 30 December 1979
Ship	State	Description
Leschi	United States	The fish processing vessel – a retired Washington sternwheel steam paddle ferry – sank in shallow water in Shotgun Cove (60°48′05″N 148°32′30″W) in Prince William Sound near Whittier, Alaska. Her wreck became a popular recreational dive site.

=== 31 December ===
List of shipwrecks: 31 December 1979
Ship	State	Description
Kowther	Cyprus	The ship, the ex-Adriatica di Navigazione (Adriatica Line) passenger/cargo ship Enotria, broke tow on the way to shipbreakers in Spain running aground at Temistokleas Bay, Piraeus, Greece.

== Unknown date ==
List of shipwrecks: Unknown date 1979
Ship	State	Description
Epimonos	Greece	The tanker caught fire off Rouen, Seine-Maritime, France. She was declared a constructive total loss.
"Madden Marr"	Ghana	The 135.16-foot (41.20 m) fishing vessel hit the bar at the entrance to Tema, Ghana attempting to come to the aid of another trawler reportedly on fire, declared a Total Loss sometime in 2000.
William R. Farrell	United States	The tug sank in 55 feet (17 m) of water in the North Atlantic Ocean off Harvey Cedars, New Jersey.
