= List of shipwrecks in 1978 =

The list of shipwrecks in 1978 includes ships sunk, foundered, grounded, or otherwise lost during 1978.

table of contents
1978
Jan	Feb	Mar	Apr
May	Jun	Jul	Aug
Sep	Oct	Nov	Dec
Unknown date

== January ==
=== 5 January ===
List of shipwrecks: 5 January 1978
Ship	State	Description
Chandragupta	India	The supercarrier Chandragupta sank in a January storm in the Pacific Ocean. 68 crewmembers died with the ship, which left an enormous trail of wreckage in the water, scattered over a 36-mile (58 km) area. Researchers ascribed the cause of an incident to an encounter with a rogue wave. This is one of the 22 supercarriers believed to have been sunk by rogue waves from 1968 to 1995, and the incident associated with the greatest loss of life.

=== 7 January ===
List of shipwrecks: 7 January 1978
Ship	State	Description
Bolero	Honduras	Sank in the Black Sea off Kilyos, Turkey.

=== 12 January ===
List of shipwrecks: 12 January 1978
Ship	State	Description
Function	United Kingdom	The vessel grounded on the quayside at Wells-next-the-Sea, Norfolk due to surge tide. The ship was cut up for scrap later that month.
Gloriosa	Cyprus	The cargo ship foundered off the coast of Norfolk, United Kingdom. Five crew were killed.
Holmar	Netherlands	The coaster capsized and sank 15 nautical miles (28 km; 17 mi) north east of Flamborough Head, Yorkshire with the loss of five crew.
Sea Diamond	Greece	The cargo ship foundered off Lowestoft, Suffolk with the loss of seven crew.

=== 13 January ===
List of shipwrecks: 13 January 1978
Ship	State	Description
Duperré	French Navy	The destroyer was driven ashore on the coast of Brittany, France. A total of 233 crew were removed by a French coast guard helicopter. A French tug refloated the ship.

=== 26 January ===
List of shipwrecks: 26 January 1978
Ship	State	Description
USS Ross	United States Navy	The Fletcher-class destroyer was sunk as a target off Puerto Rico.

== February ==
=== 2 February ===
List of shipwrecks: 2 February 1978
Ship	State	Description
Orion	United Kingdom	The oil rig, being towed on a barge, ran aground at Guernsey, Channel Islands, when the tow broke in a storm. Her crew were rescued by the St. Peter Port Lifeboat and Royal Navy helicopters.

=== 3 February ===
List of shipwrecks: 3 February 1978
Ship	State	Description
Maria Dormio	Italy	The Tudor Queen-class coaster sprang a leak and sank in the Tyrrhenian Sea 56 nautical miles (104 km; 64 mi) southwest of Cape Miseno, Italy. She was on a voyage from "Baia" to Porto Empedocle, Sicily.

=== 7 February ===
List of shipwrecks: 7 February 1978
Ship	State	Description
Can Do	United States	Northeastern United States blizzard of 1978: The 42-foot (13 m) pilot boat capsized and sank off Marblehead, Massachusetts, during a blizzard with the loss of all five people on board. She was refloated in 1981, repaired, and returned to service as a towing vessel with the name Grampus.
Peter Stuyvesant	United States	Northeastern United States blizzard of 1978: The 1,129-gross register ton motor vessel — a former passenger ship in use as a floating function hall and waiting area for the restaurant Anthony's Pier 4 in Boston, Massachusetts — broke free of her permanent docking cradle during a blizzard and sank without loss of life in 20 feet (6.1 m) of water in Boston Harbor beside the west side of Pier 4 at 42°21′12″N 071°02′30″W. Her wreck was removed in February 2017 and scrapped.

=== 10 February ===
List of shipwrecks: 10 February 1978
Ship	State	Description
Eastern Saturn	United Kingdom	The cargo ship sprang a leak and sank whilst on a voyage from Bangkok, Thailand to Apapa, Nigeria.

=== 23 February ===
List of shipwrecks: 23 February 1978
Ship	State	Description
USS Rowe	United States Navy	The Fletcher-class destroyer was sunk as a target off Puerto Rico.

== March ==
=== 10 March ===
List of shipwrecks: 10 March 1978
Ship	State	Description
Mastro Costas	Greece	The cargo ship, which had been abandoned at Monrovia, Liberia following an engine breakdown, was beached between Monrovia and the Lofa River.

=== 16 March ===
List of shipwrecks: 16 March 1978
Ship	State	Description
Amoco Cadiz	France	Amoco Cadiz. The tanker ran aground on Portsall Rocks, three nautical miles (5.6 km; 3.5 mi) off the coast of Brittany, and was wrecked. She was loaded with 255,000 tonnes of crude oil.

=== 19 March ===
List of shipwrecks: 19 March 1978
Ship	State	Description
Glacier Queen	United States	The fishing vessel sank in Hinchinbrook Entrance (60°18′20″N 146°54′15″W) off Zaikof Point (60°18′12″N 146°55′42″W) near Schooner Rock (60.3056°N 146.9056°W) on the south-central coast of Alaska. The fishing vessel Lone Fisherman (United States) rescued her crew.

=== 23 March ===
List of shipwrecks: 23 March 1978
Ship	State	Description
Kronos	Greece	The Near-Warrior type tug was struck by the cruise ship Romanza (Panama) whilst berthed at Piraeus and was severely damaged. She was declared a constructive total loss and consequently scrapped.

=== 29 March ===
List of shipwrecks: 29 March 1978
Ship	State	Description
Holmur	Denmark	The 157-foot (48 m), 412-ton cargo ship, a converted trawler, stranded at Olafsjondur, Iceland, a total loss.

== April ==
=== 1 April ===
List of shipwrecks: 1 April 1978
Ship	State	Description
Federal St Laurent	Liberia	The vessel was in a collision with Chimo and grounded at Grondines, Quebec, Canada. The ship was refloated on 4 April and returned to service.
Two unknown vessels	Kampuchea	The vessels, possibly Swift boats or auxiliary patrol boats, were sunk by a Vietnamese Navy vessel north east of Hon Doc Island.

=== 7 April ===
List of shipwrecks: 7 April 1978
Ship	State	Description
Astron	Panama	Astron, 2008 The cargo ship ran aground at Punta Cana, Dominican Republic and was wrecked.

=== 11 April ===
List of shipwrecks: 11 April 1978
Ship	State	Description
Boston Typhoon	South Africa	The 137.6-foot (41.9 m), 425-ton trawler suffered an engine room fire in April and was declared a total loss. She was scuttled on 11 April off Robben Island.

=== 14 April ===
List of shipwrecks: 14 April 1978
Ship	State	Description
Henrietta B	Denmark	The coaster foundered 50 nautical miles (93 km; 58 mi) off The Lizard, Cornwall. All thirteen crew were rescued by a French warship.

== May ==
=== 2 May ===
List of shipwrecks: 2 May 1978
Ship	State	Description
Miss Belle	United States	Under tow by the fishing vessel Pacific Sea (United States) after drifting for three days after her engine failed, the double-ended fishing vessel capsized and sank on the west side of Cape Suckling (59°59′30″N 143°53′00″W) on the south-central coast of Alaska after a huge wave struck her broadside. Pacific Sea rescued her crew of two.

=== 6 May ===
List of shipwrecks: 6 May 1978
Ship	State	Description
Eleni V	Greece	The tanker collided with the bulk carrier Roseline (France) off the Norfolk coast and capsized, remaining afloat for a number of days afterwards. The bow section was blown up and sunk on 1 June. About 5,000 tonnes of heavy fuel oil were spilt.

=== 12 May ===
List of shipwrecks: 12 May 1978
Ship	State	Description
Zeehaan	South Africa	The motor vessel foundered in the Atlantic Ocean off the coast of Namibia at 20°42′S 12°46′E.

=== 18 May ===
List of shipwrecks: 18 May 1978
Ship	State	Description
St. Luke	United Kingdom	The 138-foot (42 m), 391-ton trawler was sunk by an explosion on the Dogger Bank 160 miles (260 km) east of the River Tyne while hauling in her nets, probably caused by a naval mine or other munitions. The crew were rescued by an unknown German yacht.

=== 19 May ===
List of shipwrecks: 19 May 1978
Ship	State	Description
Unknown fishing vessels	Ethiopia	Eritrean War of Independence: An unknown number of fishing vessels were shelled and sunk by the Ethiopian Navy along the coast of the Eritrean part of the Ethiopian coast.

=== 22 May ===
List of shipwrecks: 22 May 1978
Ship	State	Description
Blind Faith	United States	The bowpicker was destroyed by fire and abandoned in the Copper River Flats near Pete Dahl Slough (60°23′N 145°27′W) on the south-central coast of Alaska.

=== 29 May ===
List of shipwrecks: 29 May 1978
Ship	State	Description
Northern Dream	United States	The 21-foot (6.4 m) vessel was destroyed by fire on the east coast of Crooked Island (57°46′30″N 152°23′30″W) in the Kodiak Archipelago near Kodiak, Alaska. A Kodiak Western Airlines Grumman Goose flying boat rescued her entire crew of three.
Rocket	United States	The troller sank in heavy seas off Cape Lynch (55°47′N 133°42′W) on Prince of Wales Island in Southeast Alaska.
Senora Sue	United States	The 35-gross register ton motor vessel sank in Lituya Bay in Southeast Alaska.

=== 30 May ===
List of shipwrecks: 30 May 1978
Ship	State	Description
R. I. P.	United States	The gillnetter sank off of “The Castle” (60°20′N 145°12′W) on the Copper River Flats on the south-central coast of Alaska.

== June ==
=== 12 June ===
List of shipwrecks: 12 June 1978
Ship	State	Description
Sonny Boy	United States	The 70-foot (21.3 m) vessel sank off the Aleutian Islands 10 nautical miles (19 km; 12 mi) from Dutch Harbor, Alaska. The vessels Cape Lynch and Crystal (both United States) rescued her crew.

=== 13 June ===
List of shipwrecks: 13 June 1978
Ship	State	Description
Yellowstone	United States	The bulk carrier collided with cargo ship Ibn Batouta (Algeria) and sank off Gibraltar.

=== 17 June ===
List of shipwrecks: 17 June 1978
Ship	State	Description
Whippoorwill	United States	The tourist boat capsized on Pomona Lake in Franklin County, Kansas, after a tornado hit her. Sixteen of the 58 people on board drowned.

=== 25 June ===
List of shipwrecks: 28 June 1978
Ship	State	Description
Chantal	Panama	The cargo ship sprang a leak off Cape Engaño, Dominican Republic and was beached. She was declared a total loss.

=== 28 June ===
List of shipwrecks: 28 June 1978
Ship	State	Description
Margaret Smith	United Kingdom	The collier capsized off Cowes, Isle of Wight (52°42′N 1°28′W) and was towed to Yarmouth, Isle of Wight. She sank the next day.

== July ==
=== 1 July ===
List of shipwrecks: 1 July 1978
Ship	State	Description
Meteor	United States	The 30-foot (9.1 m) fishing vessel burned and sank in Whale Pass (57°56′N 152°50′W) in the Kodiak Archipelago between Kodiak Island and Whale Island.

=== 2 July ===
List of shipwrecks: 2 July 1978
Ship	State	Description
Roberta Jean	United States	The fishing vessel sank in the Pacific Ocean with the loss of all hands. One body was recovered from the ocean off Bahia Tortugas, Mexico.

=== 5 July ===
List of shipwrecks: 5 July 1978
Ship	State	Description
Sea Rooter	United States	The Bayliner Sport Cruiser ran aground in Strawberry Channel 2 nautical miles (3.7 km; 2.3 mi) from Point Bentinck (60°24′N 146°00′W) off the south-central coast of Alaska and capsized in the surf. The only person on board died.

=== 8 July ===
List of shipwrecks: 8 July 1978
Ship	State	Description
USS Sealion	United States Navy	The Balao-class submarine was sunk as a target in the Atlantic Ocean off Newport, Rhode Island.

=== 18 July ===
List of shipwrecks: 18 July 1978
Ship	State	Description
Birgo	Norway	The bulk carrier was scuttled in Nedstrandfjorden by the ship owner in an insurance fraud scheme.

=== 23 July ===
List of shipwrecks: 23 July 1978
Ship	State	Description
Jayawang	Singapore	The cargo ship sank off Bangkok, Thailand. She was raised in November 1979 and moved to a new anchorage but sank again.

=== 30 July ===
List of shipwrecks: 30 July 1978
Ship	State	Description
Locuste	French Navy	The Aloe-class net laying ship struck a reef in the Pacific Ocean off Cikobia Island, Fiji, and sank.

== August ==
=== 3 August ===
List of shipwrecks: 3 August 1978
Ship	State	Description
SAS Transvaal	South African Navy	The Loch-class frigate was scuttled in Smitswinkel Bay.

=== 12 August ===
List of shipwrecks: 12 August 1978
Ship	State	Description
Saint Paul	United States	The troller struck a rock and sank in Southeast Alaska near Elfin Cove and George Island northwest of Juneau.

=== 18 August ===
List of shipwrecks: 18 August 1978
Ship	State	Description
Itasca	United States	The 64-gross register ton, 64.6-foot (19.7 m) fishing vessel was destroyed by fire in Sakie Bay (55°04′N 133°14′W) near Dall Island in the Alexander Archipelago in Southeast Alaska.

=== 24 August ===
List of shipwrecks: 24 August 1978
Ship	State	Description
Jeffery Allen	United States	The 75-foot (22.9 m) vessel sank with the loss of one life southwest of Puale Bay (57°41′N 155°29′W) on the coast of the Alaska Peninsula in Alaska. The vessel Cape Fairwell (United States) rescued her three survivors. Jeffery Allen was salvaged in October 1979.
Mary Weston	United Kingdom	The coaster collided with Macasse (Ivory Coast) and sank in the Seine 16 nautical miles (30 km) downstream of Rouen, France with the loss of four of her five crew.

=== 27 August ===
List of shipwrecks: 27 August 1978
Ship	State	Description
USS Cree	United States Navy	The decommissioned Cherokee-class fleet tug was sunk as a target.

=== 31 August ===
List of shipwrecks: 27 August 1978
Ship	State	Description
Atlantico; Jolly Azzurro	Spain; Panama	The cargo ships collided in the Strait of Gibraltar. Atlantico was towed into Gibraltar in a severely damaged condition. Jolly Azzurro sank with the loss of one of her sixteen crew; another was reported missing.

== September ==
=== 1 September ===
List of shipwrecks: 1 September 1978
Ship	State	Description
Jolly Azzuro	Panama	The cargo ship collided with Atlantico (Spain) in the Strait of Gibraltar and sank. Atlantico sustained severe damage to her bows.

=== 6 September ===
List of shipwrecks: 6 September 1978
Ship	State	Description
Wild Dog	United States	The 18-gross register ton motor vessel sank off Ugak Bay, Alaska.

=== 8 September ===
List of shipwrecks: 8 September 1978
Ship	State	Description
Bandeirante	Norway	The tanker collided with the bulk carrier Maroudio (Greece) and sank off Ouessant, France. The bulk carrier August Pacific (United Kingdom) washed out her tanks in the area where the accident occurred. She was forced to stop by L'Alerte (Marine Nationale) after ignoring demands from the dredger Baccarat (France) to stop. Her captain was fined ₣50,000 (then £5,800) for illegally discharging the oil.
Two unidentified vessels	Kampuchea	The vessels, possibly Patrol Craft Fast or auxiliary patrol boats, were sunk by a Vietnamese People's Navy vessel near Hon Doc Island.

=== 13 September ===
List of shipwrecks: 13 September 1978
Ship	State	Description
High Tide	United States	The fishing vessel sank off Spruce Cape (57°49′15″N 152°20′00″W) on the coast of Kodiak Island in Alaska′s Kodiak Archipelago.

=== 14 September ===
List of shipwrecks: 14 September 1978
Ship	State	Description
Ibn al Qis	Libyan Navy	The landing ship was destroyed by fire while at sea during an amphibious landing exercise on the night of 14–15 September.

=== 18 September ===
List of shipwrecks: 18 September 1978
Ship	State	Description
Gertrude Ann	United States	The fishing vessel capsized and was lost off Sitkinak Island in Alaska′s Kodiak Archipelago.

=== 20 September ===
List of shipwrecks: 20 September 1978
Ship	State	Description
Angel	Japan	The cargo ship collided with Dignity (Greece) 45 nautical miles (83 km; 52 mi) off Porto, Portugal and sank with the loss of eleven of her 24 crew.

=== 27 September ===
List of shipwrecks: 27 September 1978
Ship	State	Description
Saint Augustine	United States	The 42-foot (12.8 m) vessel was stranded and sank in Danger Bay, also known as Kazakof Bay (58°06′N 152°55′W) on the coast of Afognak in the Kodiak Archipelago off the coast of Alaska. The United States Coast Guard rescued her two-man crew.

=== 29 September ===
List of shipwrecks: 29 September 1978
Ship	State	Description
Puerto Princesa	Philippines	Typhoon Lola: The cargo ship drove into Fides Orient (Singapore) at Manila and was damaged beyond economic repair. Subsequently scrapped.

=== Unknown date ===
List of shipwrecks: Unknown date 1978
Ship	State	Description
Kimon	Cyprus	Lebanese Civil War: The coaster was sunk by rockets in Beirut harbor, Lebanon. Raised in 1981 and scrapped or towed to sea and scuttled.

== October ==
=== 2 October ===
List of shipwrecks: 2 October 1978
Ship	State	Description
Marion A	United States	The 37-gross register ton, 39-foot (11.9 m) crab-fishing vessel capsized and sank with the loss of two lives in Geese Channel (56°45′N 153°53′W) off Aiaktalik Island (56.7075°N 154.0568°W) in the Kodiak Archipelago off Alaska. The lone survivor was rescued from the island on 13 October by the fishing vessel Moonsong (United States).

=== 3 October ===
List of shipwrecks: 3 October 1978
Ship	State	Description
HMCS Kapuskasing	Canadian Forces Maritime Command	The Algerine-class minesweeper was sunk as a target.

=== 9 October ===
List of shipwrecks: 9 October 1978
Ship	State	Description
Skreamin Deamon	United States	While under tow, the 27-foot (8.2 m) vessel sank without loss of life off Spruce Island in the Kodiak Archipelago near Monashka Bay on Kodiak Island.

=== 12 October ===
List of shipwrecks: 12 October 1978
Ship	State	Description
Christos Bitas	Greece	The tanker ran aground off the coast of Dyfed, Wales.

=== 18 October ===
List of shipwrecks: 18 October 1978
Ship	State	Description
HMS Eagle	Royal Navy	The aircraft carrier ran aground at Loch Ryan on her way to the breaker's yard. Later refloated and scrapped.
USS Mackerel	United States Navy	The T-1-class submarine was sunk as a target off Puerto Rico.

=== 20 October ===
List of shipwrecks: 20 October 1978
Ship	State	Description
USCGC Cuyahoga	United States Coast Guard	The wreck of Cuyahoga when she was refloated on 29 October 1978. The cutter sank with the loss of 11 lives after colliding with the tanker Santa Cruz II (Argentina) in the Chesapeake Bay. There were 18 survivors. She was refloated on 29 October 1978 and scuttled on 29 March 1979 to form an artificial reef.

=== 23 October ===
List of shipwrecks: 23 October 1978
Ship	State	Description
Key West	United States	The crab-fishing vessel sank in the Bering Sea 40 nautical miles (74 km; 46 mi) north of Amak Island in the Aleutian Islands after her lazarette flooded during a storm.
Lorrinda G	United States	The fishing vessel sank in the Bering Sea.

=== 30 October ===
List of shipwrecks: 30 October 1978
Ship	State	Description
Kiowa	United States	The tug sank without loss of life in Herring Bay (57°07′N 134°22′W) on Frederick Sound in the Alexander Archipelago in Southeast Alaska after logs she was towing broke loose in heavy weather and tore her stern open. Another tug rescued her crew.
Nico Primo	Italy	The cargo ship sank in the Peloponnesus with the loss of eight of her nine crew.

=== 31 October ===
List of shipwrecks: 31 October 1978
Ship	State	Description
Christos Bitas	Greece	The tanker was scuttled 320 nautical miles (590 km) west of Fastnet Rock, United Kingdom.

== November ==
=== 3 November ===
List of shipwrecks: 3 November 1978
Ship	State	Description
Devil Sea	United States	The 44-foot (13.4 m) vessel was wrecked on Igitkin Island in the Aleutian Islands. Wearing survival suits, her crew of four reached shore and was rescued by the seagoing buoy tender USCGC Ironwood ( United States Coast Guard).
Hawarden Bridge	United Kingdom	The coaster was scuttled as an artificial reef off Miami, Florida, United States.

=== 4 November ===
List of shipwrecks: 4 November 1978
Ship	State	Description
Boston Typhoon	South Africa	The stripped, out of service 139.82-foot (42.62 m) fishing vessel was scuttled as an artificial reef off Robben Island, South Africa.
Epic	United States	The 137-gross register ton, 72.7-foot (22.2 m) crab-fishing vessel capsized and sank in the Gulf of Alaska off the south end of Alaska′s Kodiak Island with the loss of four lives. There was one survivor.

=== 7 November ===
List of shipwrecks: 7 November 1978
Ship	State	Description
Cora B	United States	After she struck a rock and flooded, the charter boat was towed to Bass Harbor (60°37′30″N 147°24′30″W) on the coast of Naked Island (60.6528°N 147.4130°W) in Prince William Sound on the south-central coast of Alaska, where she was stripped and burned.

=== 8 November ===
List of shipwrecks: 8 November 1978
Ship	State	Description
Glacier Queen	United States	The floating hotel sank at anchor in Seldovia Bay (59.4274°N 151.7249°W) in Cook Inlet on the south-central coast of Alaska. Her wreck later was refloated and in January 1979 was scuttled in the Gulf of Alaska.
Ruth A	United States	The motor vessel sank in Alaska Native Brotherhood Harbor (57°03′N 135°20′W) at Sitka, Alaska.

=== 16 November ===
List of shipwrecks: 16 November 1978
Ship	State	Description
Manureva	France	The sailboat disappeared along with her captain, Alain Colas, in the Atlantic Ocean near the Azores after Colas sent a final message on this date.

=== 20 November ===
List of shipwrecks: 20 November 1978
Ship	State	Description
Crow	United States	While carrying a cargo of construction materials to a cannery, the 117-foot (35.7 m) former landing craft sank 9 nautical miles (17 km; 10 mi) off of Wide Bay (57°22′N 156°11′W) on the south-central coast of Alaska. The United States Coast Guard rescued her crew of six from a life raft.

=== 23 November ===
List of shipwrecks: 23 November 1978
Ship	State	Description
Iwala	United States	The yacht was seized by the Kampuchean Navy for drug smuggling. She reportedly was scuttled and her two crewmen were executed by being burned alive.

=== 30 November ===
List of shipwrecks: 30 November 1978
Ship	State	Description
Heidi Marie	United States	The fishing vessel ran aground and sank in Terror Bay (57°46′N 153°12′W) on the coast of Kodiak Island in Alaska′s Kodiak Archipelago.

=== Unknown date ===
List of shipwrecks: Unknown date November 1978
Ship	State	Description
HMS Undaunted	Royal Navy	The decommissioned U and V-class destroyer was sunk as a target in the Atlantic Ocean by an Exocet missile fired by the destroyer HMS Norfolk and a torpedo fired by the submarine HMS Swiftsure (both Royal Navy).

== December ==
=== 1 December ===
List of shipwrecks: 1 December 1978
Ship	State	Description
Zephyr	United States	The fishing vessel was destroyed by fire at Old Harbor, Alaska.

=== 2 December ===
List of shipwrecks: 2 December 1978
Ship	State	Description
Fairway	United Kingdom	The 106.1-foot (32.3 m), 175-ton trawler, was wrecked in Tor Bay, Devon.

=== 6 December ===
List of shipwrecks: 6 December 1978
Ship	State	Description
Coastal Emperor	United Kingdom	The 115.4-foot (35.2 m), 250-ton oil rig standby (safety) boat, a converted trawler, ran aground on Balmedie Beach, near Aberdeen. After unsuccessful attempts at salvage she was scrapped in place.

=== 7 December ===
List of shipwrecks: 7 December 1978
Ship	State	Description
Shapacy	United States	The 90-foot (27.4 m) crab-fishing vessel capsized and sank in Kachemak Bay 2 nautical miles (3.7 km; 2.3 mi) off of Homer Spit in Homer, Alaska, with the loss of two lives.

=== 11 December ===
List of shipwrecks: 11 December 1978
Ship	State	Description
Holoholo	United States	The motor vessel was overdue on a trip in Hawaii between Honolulu Harbor and Kawaihae Harbor and was presumed capsized and sunk in the Pacific Ocean.

=== 12 December ===
List of shipwrecks: 12 December 1978
Ship	State	Description
Beachboy	United States	The 58-foot (17.7 m) vessel sank in 120 feet (37 m) of water in Alaska′s Kodiak Archipelago near Two Headed Island (56°54′N 153°35′W). Two survivors were rescued on 14 December.
SAS Good Hope	South African Navy	The decommissioned Loch-class frigate was scuttled to form an artificial reef in False Bay off the coast of South Africa.
Kimon M.	Panama	The cargo ship was wrecked on Shab Abu Reef near the Straits of Gubal. The vessel Interusja (flag unknown) rescued her cew. Kimon M. slid off the reef and sank some days later.

=== 13 December ===
List of shipwrecks: 13 December 1978
Ship	State	Description
München	West Germany	The motor ship sank in the Atlantic Ocean in a severe storm after being struck by a rogue wave.

=== 14 December ===
List of shipwrecks: 14 December 1978
Ship	State	Description
Kiska	United States	The 34-foot (10.4 m) vessel was lost off Sitkalidak Island in Alaska′s Kodiak Archipelago.

=== 22 December ===
List of shipwrecks: 22 December 1978
Ship	State	Description
Four Sons	United States	The 72-foot (21.9 m) fishing vessel was wrecked on the coast of Unalaska Island in the Aleutian Islands. The vessel American Viking (United States) rescued her entire crew.

=== 30 December ===
List of shipwrecks: 30 December 1978
Ship	State	Description
Ben Asdale	United Kingdom	The fishing trawler was wrecked in a blizzard off Falmouth, Cornwall. Three men drowned.
Oso	United States	The troller dragged her anchor during a storm, struck a rock, and sank off the west coast of Chichagof Island in the Alexander Archipelago in Southeast Alaska near White Sulfur Hot Springs (57°48′25″N 136°20′45″W). The only person aboard reached shore in a skiff; the fishing vessel Midnight Charger (United States) rescued him five weeks later.

== Unknown date ==
List of shipwrecks: Unknown date 1978
Ship	State	Description
Betsy Ross	United States	The Liberty ship was scuttled off the coast of Florida.
Menoquet	United States	The 197-gross register ton, 106-foot (32.3 m) tug sank in Katlian Bay (57°09′N 135°23′W) in Southeast Alaska sometime prior to 1979, i.e., in 1978 or earlier.
"Moreleigh"	United Kingdom	The sold off MFV-1501 class motor fishing vessel was stripped of useful equipment and put in a marsh near the dock channel, Fleetwood, and abandoned sometime in 1978.
Pamela Joy	United Kingdom	The tug was severely damaged by fire. Declared a constructive total loss and consequently scrapped.
