= Sugar Transporter =

Sugar Transporter can refer to:

== Science ==
- Sugar transporter is a synonym of Glucose transporter

== Ships ==
- SS Sugar Transporter - two ships with this name
- MV Sugar Transporter, a British-built bulk carrier launched in 1970 and sunk in 1991
