= HDMS Springeren =

Five ships of the Danish Royal Navy have borne the name HDMS Springeren:

- HDMS Springeren (1891) (1891–1919), a torpedo boat launched in 1891 and renamed T 1 in 1916. She was decommissioned in 1919.
- HDMS Springeren (1916) (1917–1946), a torpedo boat launched in 1916 she was re-rated as a minesweeper in 1929.
- HDMS Springeren (1951) (1947–1957), an U-class submarine launched as HMS P52 and loaned to the Polish Navy as ORP Dzik in 1942. She returned to the Royal Navy in 1946 and was transferred to Denmark in 1947 initially as HDMS U-1 but was renamed HDMS Springeren in 1951. She was returned to the Royal Navy in 1958 and scrapped.
- HDMS Springeren (S329) (1964–1990), a Delfinen-class submarine launched in 1963. Decommissioned in 1990 and preserved as a museum ship.
- HDMS Springeren (S324) (1991–2004), a Tumleren-class submarine launched in 1964 as HNoMS Kya she was transferred to Denmark as HDMS Springeren in 1991. She was decommissioned in 2004.
