= Holoholo =

Holoholo may refer to:

- Holoholo people, an ethnic group in the Democratic Republic of the Congo
- Holoholo language, their language
- MV Holoholo, a Hawaiian research vessel
