= John Laney (disambiguation) =

John Laney was a politician.

John Laney may also refer to:

- John Laney (ship owner), see MV Holoholo
- John Malcolm Laney, basketball coach
