= Forevergreen =

Forevergreen may refer to:

- MV Forevergreen, a Singaporean cargo ship in service 1976–1977
- "Forevergreen", a 1992 single by Finitribe
- Forevergreen (film), 2025 American animated short film
