= Molopo =

Molopo may refer to:

- Molopo River, in Botswana and South Africa
- MV Molopo, a Singaporean coaster in service in 1964
