= Carraig Aonair (The Lone Rock) =

Irish folk lament for four sons lost at sea on the Fastnet Rock

Song
- Language: Irish with English singing translation
- English title: The Lone Rock
- Written: post 1691
- Songwriter(s): Conchbhar O laoghaire (Conor O'Leary)

Carraig Aonair is an Irish folk song. A singing translation into English is The Lone Rock which differs in some small details. Carraig Aonair is better known in English as the Fastnet Rock, about 4 miles (6.4 km) southwest of Cape Clear Island, County Cork, in Ireland.

== Events ==
Some time after 1691, Finin, Cormac and Donal, the sons of Conchbhar O laoghaire (Conor O'Leary) along with their unnamed brother-in-law set off on a fishing trip a few days before Christmas to get a New Year's gift of fish. During the trip something went wrong, neither version is explicit but the Irish words refer to a "deceptive calm" when they set off. The boat was wrecked upon the Fastnet rock. All four men reached the rock, but the rising tide doomed them. Their father was grief-stricken and the song is his lament.

== Song ==
Caroll 2014 provides both the English versification and a literal translation of the original Irish. The Irish original is posted earlier on the same website. The first verse sets the scene; they set off shortly before day-break with the sea a "deceptive calm" (Irish), "Calm and peaceful" (English). Verse 2 relates that Donal, the youngest, was washed up on the shore two weeks later. Verse 3 relates that Thomas managed to scratch a description of what had happened by using his shoe buckle on the rudder of the wrecked boat. The verse ends with Thomas saying that the rock would be his spouse (Irish) or lover (English) for ever. Verse 4 mentions Cormac, then verse 5 refers to a joyless Christmas and laments that the four men could not be buried in Aghadown [Aughadown?] churchyard. In the next two verses the father wishes that his sons had joined the Wild Geese and gone abroad to France or Spain, they would not then be wedded to the rock. Conor then tells his daughter not to grieve, she'll find another husband but he'll never find his sons again. He describes himself as "withered and gaunt" before complaining that his second wife (the boys' step-mother) doesn't understand his grief. Even in church he is reminded of where they used to kneel and in the final verse the motif of being wedded to the rock returns in the last line.

== Dating ==
The reference in both the Irish and English versions to the "Wild Geese" alludes to the Flight of the Wild Geese. Following the Treaty of Limerick (3 October 1691) the Jacobite soldiers left Ireland to serve in French and Spanish armies. The term was also applied more generally to Irish soldiers who left to serve in continental European armies in the 16th, 17th and 18th centuries.

== Notes ==
=== Bibliography ===
- Brían (3 August 2003), "Lyrics Add: carraig aonair", Mudcat
- Caroll, Jim (11 September 2014), "RE: carraig aonair", Mudcat. Caroll cites O'Sullivan 1981 as his source.
- Deere-Jones, Sarah (November 1987), Harpsong (Sleeve notes), Fuchsia Prospects
- Murphy, James H. (1994), "The Wild Geese", The Irish Review (16 (Autumn–Winter, 1994)), Cork University Press: 23–28, doi:10.2307/29735753, JSTOR 29735753
- O'Sullivan, Donal J, ed. (1 April 1981), Songs of the Irish, The Mercier Press, ISBN 978-0853426530
