= USS Yew =

History

United States
- Name: USS Yew (YN-32)
- Namesake: Yew tree
- Builder: John H. Mathis & Company, Camden, New Jersey
- Laid down: 22 May 1941
- Launched: 4 October 1941
- Sponsored by: Miss Alice E. Morgan
- In service: 1 July 1942
- Reclassified: AN-37, 1 January 1944
- Commissioned: 1 January 1944
- Decommissioned: 30 November 1944, Oran, Algeria
- Fate: Transferred to the French Navy, 30 November 1944
- Stricken: 28 April 1949

History

France
- Name: Scorpion (A728)
- Acquired: 30 November 1944
- Fate: Sold to Malaysian owners; struck a reef off Cikobia Island, Fiji, 30 July 1978, while under tow from the former Locuste; both ships sunk

General characteristics
- Class & type: Aloe-class net laying ship
- Displacement: 560 long tons (570 t), light; 850 long tons (860 t), full
- Length: 163 ft 2 in (49.73 m)
- Beam: 30 ft 6 in (9.30 m)
- Draft: 11 ft 8 in (3.56 m)
- Propulsion: direct drive diesel, single propeller
- Speed: 12.5 knots (23.2 km/h)
- Complement: 48 officers and enlisted
- Armament: 1 × single 3 in (76 mm) gun mount; 2 × 20 mm guns

USS Yew (YN-32/AN-37) was an Aloe-class net laying ship built for the United States Navy during World War II. She was later transferred to the French Navy as Scorpion (A728). She was sold to Malaysian owners but sank while under tow from the former French ship Locuste (A765) when that ship struck a reef off Cikobia Island, Fiji, on 30 July 1978 and also sank.

== Career ==
Yew (YN-37) was laid down on 22 May 1941 at Camden, New Jersey, by John H. Mathis & Company; launched on 4 October 1941; sponsored by Miss Alice E. Morgan, daughter of Comdr. A. L. Morgan, USN (Ret.); and placed in service on 1 July 1942.

Records for Yew's service are practically nonexistent. The fragmentary evidence available shows that the ship was reclassified AN-37 on 1 January 1944. The net tender was ultimately decommissioned at Oran, Algeria, on 30 November 1944 and simultaneously transferred to the French Navy under lend-lease.

She served as Scorpion (A728) until she was nominally returned by the French on 21 March 1949 but was sold outright to the French on the same day. Her American name, Yew, was struck from the Navy List on 28 April 1949.

Scorpion served the French Navy into the mid-1970s before she was sunk at Cikobia Island, Fiji, 30 July 1978.
