= Caroline of Leigh =

British built yacht which sank off Dorset in 1979

History
- Name: Caroline of Leigh
- Owner: Patrick Godfrey
- Builder: A. H. Moody & Son Ltd.
- Completed: 1979
- Fate: Sank on 14 December 1979

Caroline of Leigh was a Moody 36 yacht which sank three miles (4.8 km) off Lulworth Cove, Dorset, England on 14 December 1979 with the loss of four lives. Three bodies were subsequently washed ashore and the wreck was located in June 1980, but the cause of the sinking was never determined.

== Sinking ==
Caroline of Leigh was a newly built £35,000 Moody 36 yacht which was bought by Englishman Patrick Godfrey, who intended to take it Greece and use it for charter work in the Mediterranean. On her maiden voyage to Bordeaux, France, Godfrey was accompanied by three German nationals: professional skipper Wilfried Niemann, seaman Lothar Griep and nurse Ursula Buths. The yacht departed A. H. Moody & Sons boatyard at Swanwick, near Southampton, on 12 December. Due to rough weather conditions, the yacht called into Portland Harbour that night. The crew mistakenly believed that they were in Weymouth Harbour, but the naval authorities allowed the yacht to remain at Portland overnight. She then departed for Weymouth the following day.

Despite an ongoing gale with force 10 winds, she departed Weymouth on 14 December 1979 and sank under mysterious circumstances off the coast of nearby Lulworth Cove, with the loss of all four on board. The yacht was equipped with the latest navigational aids and safety equipment, but no distress calls were made.

The first indication of the sinking was the recovery of a storm jacket, containing personal documents belonging to Griep, at Chapman's Pool on 18 December 1979. A body, later identified as belonging to Niemann, was discovered at Chapman's Pool on 28 December 1979, followed by the recovery of Griep's body in the same area on 2 January 1980. Godfrey's badly decomposed body was washed ashore on Chesil Beach on 10 February 1980.

Owing to the undetermined circumstances surrounding the sinking, an open verdict was recorded at the inquest. The body of Buths was never recovered, although authorities reported that the discovery of a leg bone in a tracksuit, found wrapped around a lobster pot off Swanage by fishermen on 26 July 1982, possibly belonged to her.

== Discovery of wreck ==
In early 1980, fishermen trawling off Lulworth Cove recovered some wreckage from the yacht, namely a small control panel. On 11 July 1980, a fisherman recovered the Thornycroft engine, still attached to part of the hull, in his trawl net off White Nothe, about half a mile away from the wreck's position.

Between February and June 1980, Richard Farwell of the Dorset Sub-Aqua Club, and Dave Mountjoy, Neil Rowley and John Ray of Weymouth and Portland BSAC worked together to locate the wreck. The team were granted the use of a small research and survey vessel, Sea Searcher, by local manufacturer Waverley Electronics, which was equipped with a side-scan sonar. The team recorded a number of anomalies on the seabed, but weather conditions prevented dives to begin investigating them until late May.

A dive on 4 June 1980 resulted in the discovery of a toothbrush holder, which was quickly confirmed to be of the same type fitted to the yacht. The echo sounder search undertaken that day revealed two contacts and, after a period of delay due to unfavourable weather, the wreck was identified, surveyed, photographed and searched during a dive on 24 June 1980, approximately three miles off Lulworth Cove in 110 feet of water. The yacht was found to have suffered "severe structural damage".

The yacht was split into two sections, but remained joined by the steel rigging of the deck rails. Some of the centre cockpit, half of the saloon area, the keel and the hull section below the stern, were missing. The auxiliary motor instrumental panel, with ignition keys still in place, was recovered. Upon its discovery, the East Dorset coroner, Nigel Neville-Jones, suggested the wreck could be raised for examination, with a possible reopening of the inquest, but this was not carried out due to costs.

The team of four divers, along with an additional three divers (Jon Ayling, Barbara Ayling and Graham Blake), returned to the wreck in July 1980 to conduct a search for the body of Buths at the request of the coroner. Lifting bags were used to raise both sections at an angle and they were then lowered back down onto the seabed. The body was not found.

== Aftermath ==
The cause of the sinking was never established and it remained uncertain whether the yacht broke up in heavy weather or was involved in a collision with a larger vessel. There was no evidence of an explosion, the ship having run aground or the presence of paint from another vessel on the exterior of the wreck. A spokesman for A. H. Moody & Son Ltd., upon seeing photographs of the wreck, stated that it was not a "natural boating accident" but "pretty obvious[ly] caused by an external force of some kind".
