= SS Sugar Transporter =

Sugar Transporter was the name of two steamships operated by Silvertown Services Ltd.

- SS Sugar Transporter (1945)
- SS Sugar Transporter (1957)
