= USS Locust (AN-22) =

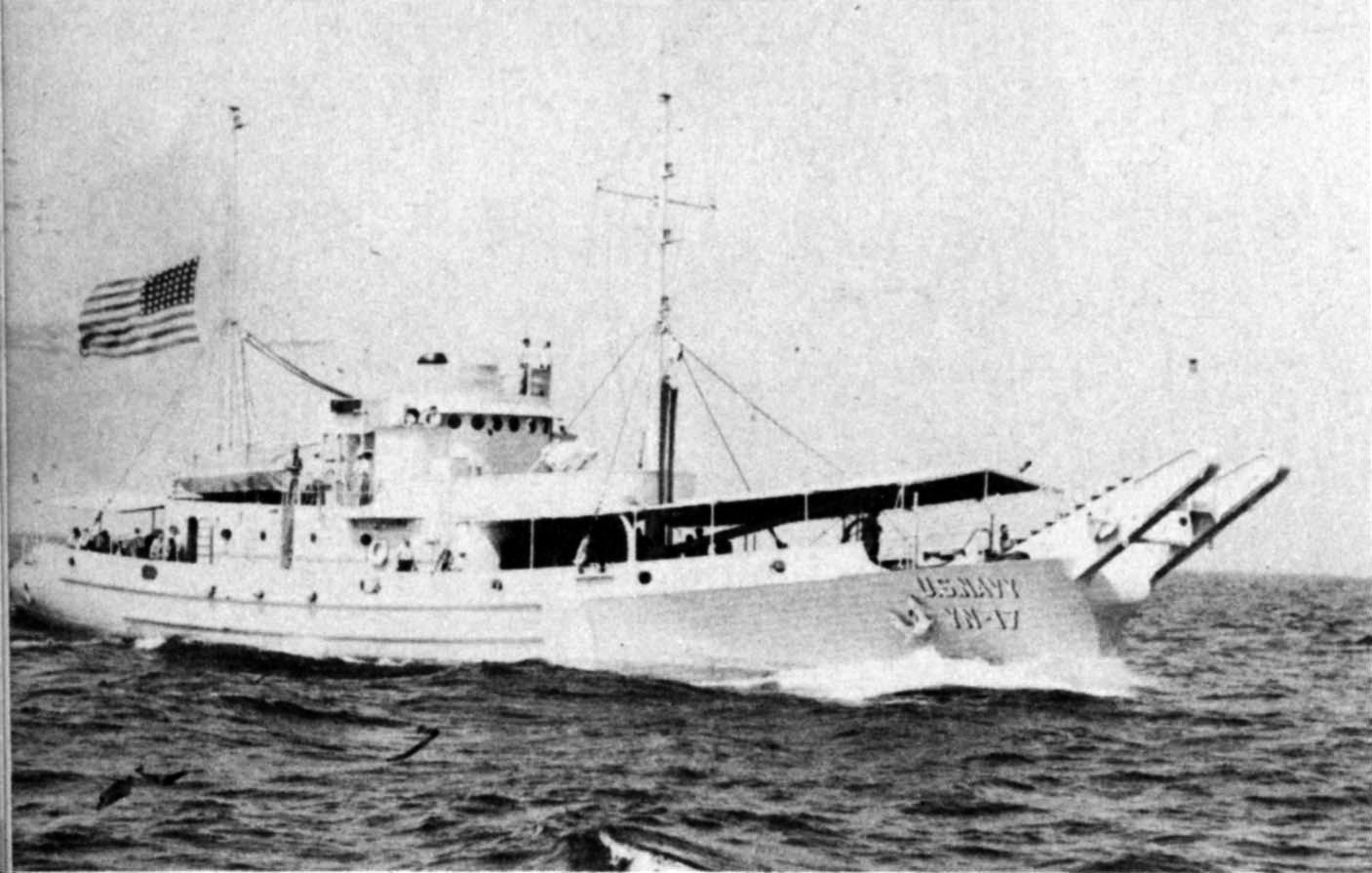
- Locust (YN-17) underway, probably during builders trials in late December 1942, off Cleveland, OH

History

United States
- Name: USS Locust (YN-17)
- Namesake: locust tree
- Builder: American Shipbuilding Company, Cleveland, Ohio
- Laid down: 18 October 1940
- Launched: 1 February 1941
- In service: 13 July 1941
- Commissioned: December 1942
- Reclassified: AN-22, 20 January 1944
- Decommissioned: 8 July 1946, Astoria, Oregon
- Stricken: 1 September 1962
- Honors and awards: "Consolidation of Solomon Islands" campaign
- Fate: transferred to the French Navy

History

France
- Name: Locuste (A765)
- Fate: Sold to Malaysian owners; struck a reef off Cikobia Island, Fiji, 30 July 1978, while towing the former Scorpion; both ships sunk

General characteristics
- Class & type: Aloe-class net laying ship
- Displacement: 560 long tons (570 t), light; 850 long tons (860 t), full
- Length: 163 ft 2 in (49.73 m)
- Beam: 30 ft 6 in (9.30 m)
- Draft: 11 ft 8 in (3.56 m)
- Propulsion: direct drive diesel, single propeller
- Speed: 12.5 knots (23.2 km/h)
- Complement: 48 officers and enlisted
- Armament: 1 × single 3 in (76 mm) gun mount; 2 × .30 cal. machine guns; 2 × depth charge tracks

USS Locust (YN-17/AN-22) was an Aloe-class net laying ship built for the United States Navy during World War II. She was later transferred to the French Navy as Locuste (A765). She was sold to Malaysian owners but sank after striking a reef off Cikobia Island, Fiji, on 30 July 1978. She was towing the former French ship Scorpion, which also sank.

== Career ==
The second ship to be so named by the Navy, Locust (YN-17) was laid down by the American Shipbuilding Company, Cleveland, Ohio, 18 October 1940; launched 1 February 1941; and placed in service 13 July 1941 for passage down the St. Lawrence River for a year of net-laying duties in the 3d Naval District off New York, New York, before commissioning December, 1942.

Assigned to the Service Squadron, Pacific Fleet, the beginning of 1943, Locust laid and tended torpedo nets, moorings, and buoys and participated in various towing and salvage operations in the South Pacific Ocean through World War II.

The net tender was off San Cristobel Island, in the Solomon Islands, in April 1943 with Task Unit 32.4.7 when she came under attack the 5th. For about 5 minutes Locust, with YAG-26 in tow, was not only dodging fire from a Japanese bomber but also a torpedo from an undetected enemy submarine.

Successfully evading the assault, she continued her role in the ultimate naval victory, serving in the Solomon Islands, Marshall Islands, and New Hebrides through her reclassification to AN-22 on 20 January 1944.

She departed for the U.S. West Coast 6 August 1945, arriving San Pedro, California, the 18th. With the postwar disarmament policy in force Locust spent the next 6 months moving from one west coast berthing area to another until 8 July 1946 when she decommissioned at Astoria, Oregon, and entered the Atlantic Reserve Fleet in the Columbia River, Oregon, where she remained until stricken from the U.S. Naval Vessel Register 1 September 1962.

Locust was later sold to and commissioned in the French Navy as Locuste (A765). In later service, she struck a reef off Cikobia Island, Fiji, 30 July 1978 and sank.
