= MV Sugar Transporter =

History
- Name: Sugar Transporter
- Owner: Sugar Line Limited
- Port of registry: Cyprus
- Route: United Kingdom – Australia
- Builder: Lithgows Port Glasgow
- Yard number: 1181
- Launched: 25 March 1970
- Fate: Sank in 1991

General characteristics
- Type: Bulk Carrier
- Tonnage: 13,907 GT; 20,600 LT DWT
- Length: 550 ft (170 m)
- Beam: 74 ft (23 m)
- Depth: 31 ft (9.4 m)
- Propulsion: Six-cylinder B&W-Kincaid diesel engine

MV Sugar Transporter was a British built Bulk carrier. It was launched on 25 March 1970 and was sunk at anchorage off Socotra Island near the Horn of Africa in 1991. It was also named the Kefalonia Wind, Sea Transporter, and Sunset. The ship was owned by the Sugar Line Limited, as well as Oceanfever Marine.
