= Algoma Quebecois =

Lake freighter built in 1962

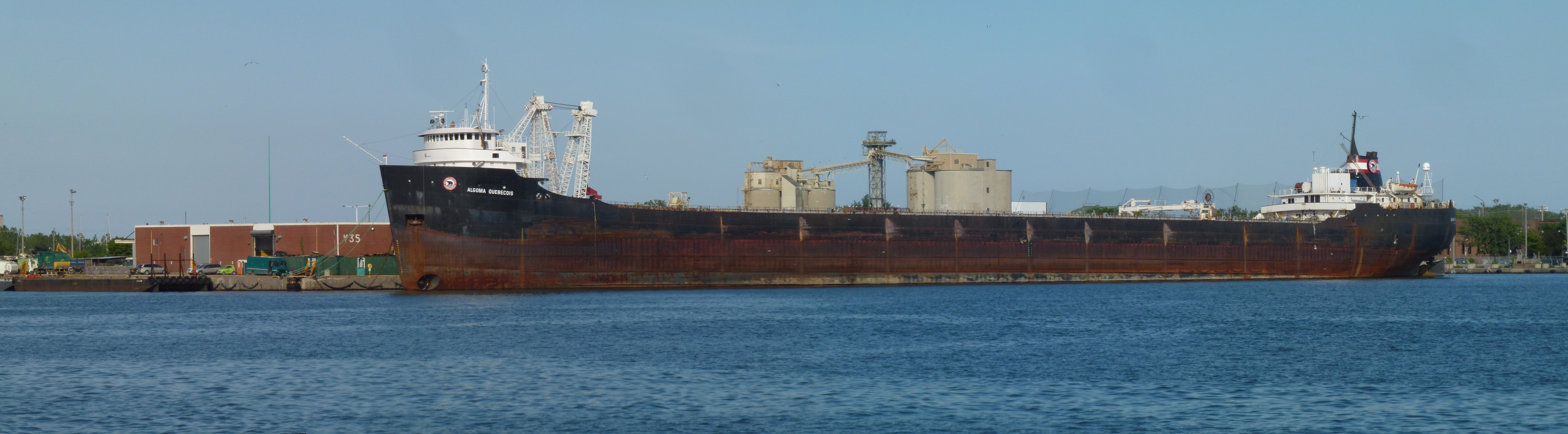
- Algoma Québécois moored at the Toronto portlands in June 2013.

History
- Name: Quebecois
- Owner: Canadian General Electric Company (1963–1965); Papachristidis Co Ltd (1965–1972); Jackes Sg Ltd (1972–1975); Upper Lakes Sg Ltd (1975–2012); Algoma Central (2012–2013)
- Port of registry: Montreal (1963–1972); Toronto (1972–2013)
- Builder: Canadian Vickers Ltd., Montreal
- Laid down: June 1962
- Launched: 10 November 1962
- Completed: 24 April 1963
- Renamed: Algoma Quebecois (2012)
- Identification: Official number: 319265; IMO number: 5287847; Call sign: CYGR; MMSI number: 316001712
- Fate: Scrapped at Port Colborne, Ontario 21 November 2013

General characteristics
- Type: Lake freighter
- Tonnage: 17,646 GRT; 12,741 NT; 27,400 DWT
- Length: 222.5 m (730 ft 0 in) oa; 215.7 m (707 ft 8 in) pp
- Beam: 23.0 m (75 ft 6 in)
- Propulsion: 1 × 9,896 shp (7,379 kW) steam turbine, single screw
- Speed: 16.5 knots (30.6 km/h; 19.0 mph)

Quebecois was a lake freighter that served the Great Lakes, operating between ports in the United States and Canada. The vessel was launched in 1962 by Canadian Vickers Ltd of Montreal, Quebec, Canada. Used to carry grain and ore, Quebecois was built to the maximum dimensions allowed on the Saint Lawrence Seaway. The vessel entered service in 1963 and in 2012, the ship's named was altered to Algoma Quebecois. The ship was broken up for scrap at Port Colborne, Ontario, Canada in 2013.

== Description ==
Quebecois measured 17,646 GRT, 27,400 tons deadweight (DWT) and a 12,741 net tonnage (NT). The lake freighter was 222.5 m (730 ft 0 in) long overall and 215.7 m (707 ft 8 in) between perpendiculars with a beam of 23.0 m (75 ft 6 in).

The ship was powered by a 9,896-shaft-horsepower (7,379 kW) Canadian General Electric Type MD70 two-stage steam turbine engine with Babcock & Wilcox header-type boilers turning one screw and a bow thruster. This gave the ship a maximum speed of 16.5 knots (30.6 km/h; 19.0 mph). The vessel had twenty hatches feeding into five holds and had capacity for 27,800 tons at her maximum mid-summer draught of 8.43 m (27 ft 8 in).

== Service history ==
The vessel was a bulk carrier built to the maximum dimensions of the St. Lawrence Seaway locks. Quebecois was the fourth ship of a six-ship design built in the shipbuilding boom following the opening of the seaway. Laid down in June 1962 with the yard number 280 by Canadian Vickers Ltd. at their yard in Montreal, Quebec, Canada the ship was built in two sections with the fore part launched on 8 September 1962 and the aft on 10 November 1962. The vessel was completed on 22 April 1963 and though owned by the Canadian General Electric Company, was chartered by Papachristidis Company. The ship was registered in Montreal. In 1965, Quebecois was acquired by Papachristidis. The laker carried loads of grain and ore between Canadian and American ports along the St. Lawrence Seaway and the Great Lakes.

During the winter lay-up in 1972 Papachristidis sold Quebecois to Jackes Shipping, where the ship was re-registered to Toronto, Ontario. In 1975 Upper Lakes Shipping took over ownership of Quebecois. On 26 August 1979 the laker ran aground on a mud bank at the entrance to Lake St. Clair due to an electronic malfunction. The vessel was freed after nine hours without suffering significant damage. Quebecois ran aground in the St. Lawrence River off Van Rensselaer Point on 12 November 1982. The ship remained aground until freed the next day without major damage. Beginning in October 1990, Quebecois began delivering cement clinker to Duluth, Minnesota.

In 2011, Upper Lakes Shipping was acquired by Algoma Central. In 2012, the vessel's name was changed to Algoma Quebecois. The vessel was towed to International Marine Salvage in Port Colborne, Ontario on 21 November 2013 where she was broken up for scrap.

== Sources ==
- Bawal, Raymond A. Jr. (2009). Twilight of the Great Lakes Steamers. Clinton, Michigan: Inland Expressions. ISBN 978-0-9818-157-2-5.
- "Quebecois (5287847)". Miramar Ship Index.
- "Made to fit". Professional Mariner: Journal of the Maritime Industry (October/November 2004). Archived from the original on 13 May 2012.
- Wharton, George. "Algoma Quebecois". boatnerd.com. Archived from the original on 3 January 2019.
