= USCGC Cuyahoga =

US Coast Guard Active-class patrol boat

Coordinates: 36°57′39″N 75°22′11″W

USCGC Cuyahoga (WIX-157)
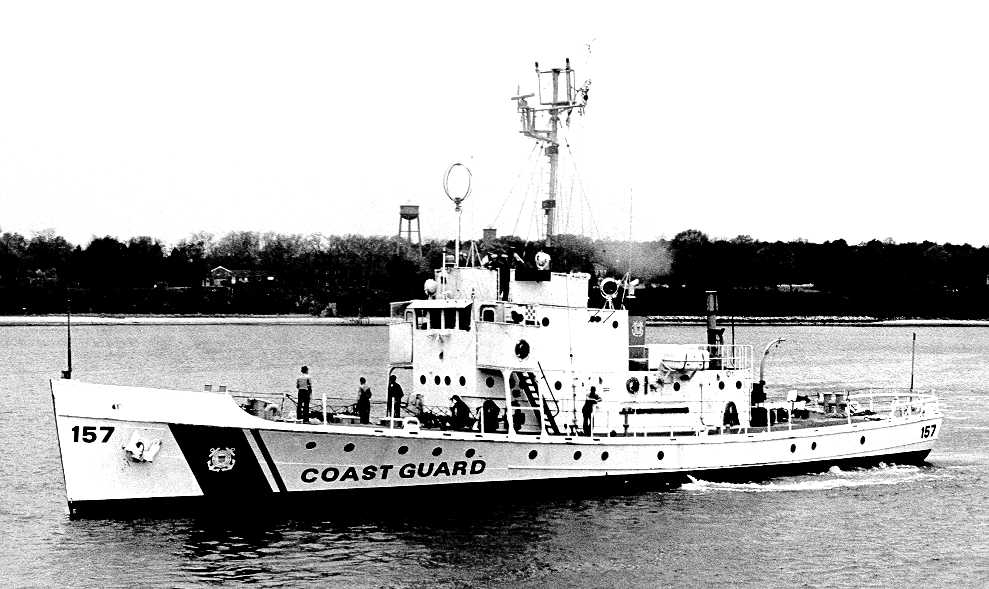

History

United States
- Name: Cuyahoga
- Namesake: Cuyahoga River in Ohio
- Builder: American Brown Boveri Electric Corporation, Camden, New Jersey
- Laid down: 1926
- Launched: 27 January 1927
- Commissioned: 3 March 1927
- Decommissioned: 29 May 1933
- Identification: WSC-157
- Fate: Transferred to the U.S. Navy

United States
- Commissioned: 1 April 1935
- Decommissioned: 17 May 1941
- Identification: AG-26
- Fate: Returned to the U.S. Coast Guard

United States
- Commissioned: 17 May 1941 (USCG)
- Identification: WIX-157
- Fate: Sunk in collision 20 October 1978; Refloated 29 October 1978; Scuttled 29 March 1979

General characteristics
- Class & type: Active-class patrol boat
- Displacement: 320 tons
- Length: 125 ft (38 m)
- Beam: 23.5 ft (7.2 m)
- Draft: 9 ft (2.7 m)
- Propulsion: twin diesel
- Range: 4,900 miles (7,900 km)
- Complement: 29
- Sensors & processing systems: SF-1 radar; QCO-1 sonar (1945); SPS-23 radar, no sonar (1960)
- Armament: 1 × 3"/23 caliber dual-purpose gun; 2 × depth charge racks (1942); 1 × 40 mm/60; 2 × 20 mm/80; 2 × Mousetraps (1945); 1 × 40 mm Bofors/60 (1960)

USCGC Cuyahoga (WIX-157) was an Active-class patrol boat built in 1927 which saw action in World War II. Cuyahoga sank after a night-time collision in the Chesapeake Bay while on patrol in 1978. She was later raised and re-sunk as an artificial reef off the Virginia coast and is a popular recreational dive site.

== Background ==
The Active-class was one of the most useful and long lasting in the service. Thirty-three ships were built with sixteen cutters still in use in the 1960s. The last to be decommissioned was USCGC Morris in 1970; the last in service was Cuyahoga, sunk in 1978. They were designed for the outer line of patrol during prohibition, trailing mother ships. They gained a reputation for durability only enhanced by their re-engining in the late 1930s; their original 6-cylinder diesels were replaced by significantly more powerful 8-cylinder GE 268-A engines, each with 800 bhp (600 kW) that used the original engine beds and gave the vessels 3 additional knots. All served in World War II, however, USCGC Jackson and USCGC Bedloe, were lost in the Great Atlantic Hurricane in 1944. Ten were refitted as buoy tenders during World War II and reverted to patrol work afterward.

== History ==
=== U.S. Coast Guard (WSC-157) ===
USCGC Cuyahoga was built by American Brown Boveri, launched 27 January 1927 and commissioned 3 March 1927 at Camden, New Jersey. After commissioning, she saw duty in the Atlantic enforcing prohibition by intercepting rumrunners.

=== United States Navy (AG-26) ===
On 29 May 1933 Cuyahoga arrived at the Washington Navy Yard and commissioned in the U.S. Navy on 1 April 1935 as AG-26, a tender for the Presidential Yacht USS Potomac.

=== U.S. Coast Guard (WIX-157) ===
She returned to Coast Guard jurisdiction on 17 May 1941 and recommissioned by the Coast Guard at the Washington Navy Yard on that day. She arrived at her new permanent station at Baltimore, Maryland 20 May 1941.

On 17 January 1942 her permanent station was changed from Baltimore to Norfolk, Virginia, where she reported to Commander Defense Area Group for duty. During World War II Cuyahoga was on escort duty attached to Commander Eastern Sea Frontier and Commander Caribbean Sea Frontier. From October 1942 to June 1945 she spent the majority of her time in the Caribbean Sea, usually escorting vessels between Guantanamo Bay, Trinidad and Paramaribo. During the war Cuyahoga was armed with one 3 in (76 mm)/23 caliber antiaircraft gun and two depth charge racks.

After the war, Cuyahoga operated out of Norfolk until May 1946 when she, along with Calypso, was placed "In Commission-Reserve" status due to personnel shortages. In April 1947 Cuyahoga was transferred from Norfolk to the United States Coast Guard Yard at Curtis Bay, Maryland and worked with the Field Testing and Development Unit except for occasional engineering and other operational activities.

From 1957 to 1959 she was assigned to New London, Connecticut for training officer candidates. Later in 1959 arrived at Yorktown, Virginia where she continued to provide training for officer candidates.

==== Collision and sinking ====
On 20 October 1978, Cuyahoga was the oldest commissioned vessel in Coast Guard service and was conducting a night-time training cruise during clear weather. She was heading north at 12 knots in the Chesapeake Bay off Smith Point Light near the mouth of the Potomac River. At 8:45pm, Officer Candidate Officer of the Deck Earl Fairchild reported sighting a light on the northern horizon. The commanding officer, Chief Warrant Officer Donald K. Robinson confirmed this observation and after evaluating the radar contact misidentified the contact as a similarly northbound small vessel, likely a fishing boat turning into the Potomac River at 15,700 yards. In fact, it was the 521-foot Argentinian bulk freighter, M/V Santa Cruz II, loaded with 19,000 tons of coal, bound for San Nicolás de los Arroyos, Argentina traveling south at over 14 knots.

The pilot of Santa Cruz, John P. Hamill, identified Cuyahoga, and neither he nor the ship's Captain Abdelardo Albornoz were concerned as the two ships appeared to be passing port-to-port. When the two vessels were 1,200 yards apart Cuyahoga turned west, into the path of Santa Cruz, to enter the Potomac River to moor for the night. Hamill immediately sounded Santa Cruz's whistle signaling that he would maintain course and speed and that the cutter should return to its original course. After waiting 30 seconds without any response from Cuyahoga Hamill sounded a danger warning of five short blasts.

Robinson still believed the vessel was a small fishing boat and that it was also turning into the Potomac River, sounded his whistle in acknowledgement and turned further west. Robinson realized that he was about to collide with a freighter and ordered "all engines stop," then "full reverse". At 9:07pm, the bulbous underwater bow of Santa Cruz tore through Cuyahoga's midship, 40 feet from the stern, rolling her over at a 50 degree angle. Robinson had reversed back into the path of Santa Cruz.

Cuyahoga sank within two minutes of the collision in 58 feet of water. The cutter's 13-foot Boston Whaler utility boat had popped free of the sinking vessel and Boatswain's Mate Roger Wild put the injured survivors in the boat. The un-injured clung to the sides of the boat until the freighter returned to pick up survivors. Eleven on board Cuyahoga were killed, but 18 survived.

The Marine Casualty Report, number USCG 16732/92368 dated 31 July 1979, concluded:

The Commandant has determined that the proximate cause of the casualty was that the commanding officer of the USCGC CUYAHOGA failed to properly identify the navigation lights displayed by the M/V SANTA CRUZ II. As a result he did not comprehend that the vessels were in a meeting situation, and altered the CUYAHOGA's course to port taking his vessel into the path of the SANTA CRUZ II.

===== Post-collision repair and scuttling =====
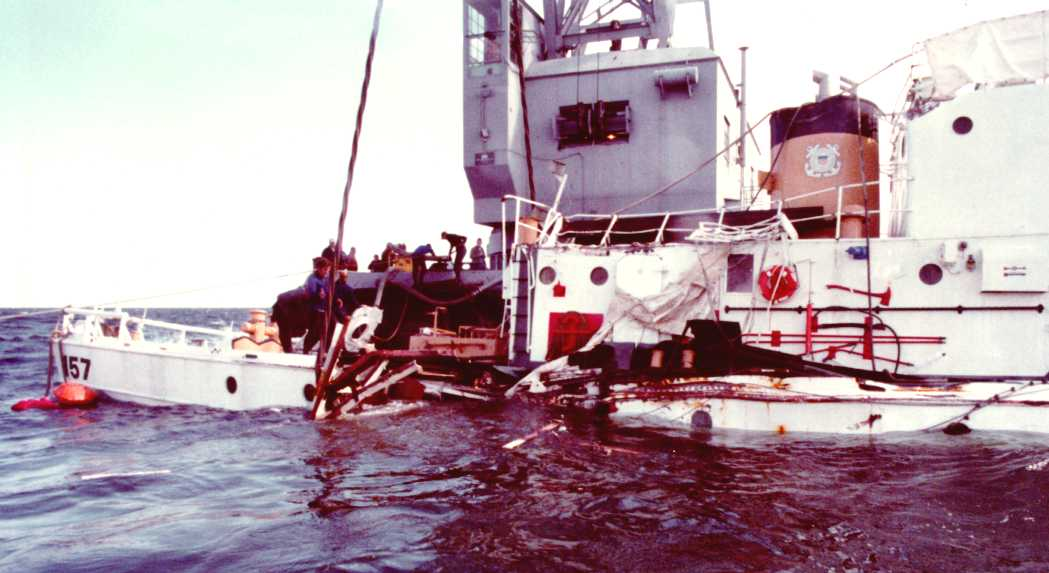
USCGC Cuyahoga being raised

Two U.S. Navy floating cranes were brought to the scene of the sinking and on 29 October 1978 Cuyahoga was raised. She was towed to Portsmouth, Virginia, where the hole was patched. On 26 November 1978, it was decided to scuttle the ship in the Atlantic Ocean off the Virginia Capes to create an artificial reef for fishing. Cuyahoga was towed 15 nautical miles (28 km; 17 mi) offshore and on 29 March 1979 she was scuttled. She sits upright on the seafloor in 100 feet (30 meters) of water.

== Bibliography ==
- Flynn, Jim; Lortz, Ed; Lukas, Holger (March 2018). "Answer 39/48". Warship International. LV (January 2018): 23–25. ISSN 0043-0374.
