= SS Sugar Transporter (1957) =

Coordinates: 58°48′N 20°21′E

History
- Name: Sugar Transporter (1957–1966); MALMI (1966–1979)
- Owner: Silvertown Services Shipping Co. Ltd (1957–1966); Etaliä – Snomen Laiva O/Y (1966–1979)
- Builder: Hall, Russell & Company
- Yard number: 859
- Launched: 21 November 1957
- Sponsored by: Mrs J.F.P. Tate
- Identification: Official number: 187743
- Fate: Sank 1979

General characteristics
- Tonnage: 6,550 GRT
- Length: 370 ft (110 m)
- Beam: 53 ft (16 m)
- Depth: 28 ft (8.5 m)

SS Sugar Transporter was the title of a cargo ship built by Hall, Russell & Company and launched on 21 November 1957. Its construction was sponsored by the wife of Mr. J. F. P. Tate, a director of Silvertown Services Shipping Company Ltd. In 1966, the ship's name was changed to Malmi under new owners from Helsinki, Finland. On 6 December 1979, during a voyage from Gdańsk, Poland to Koverhar, Malmi capsized and sank in the Baltic Sea, 40 nautical miles (46 mi; 74 km) northeast of Gotska Sandön, when her cargo of coke shifted in heavy weather.
