= Moody Yachts =

English sailing yacht brand

Moody
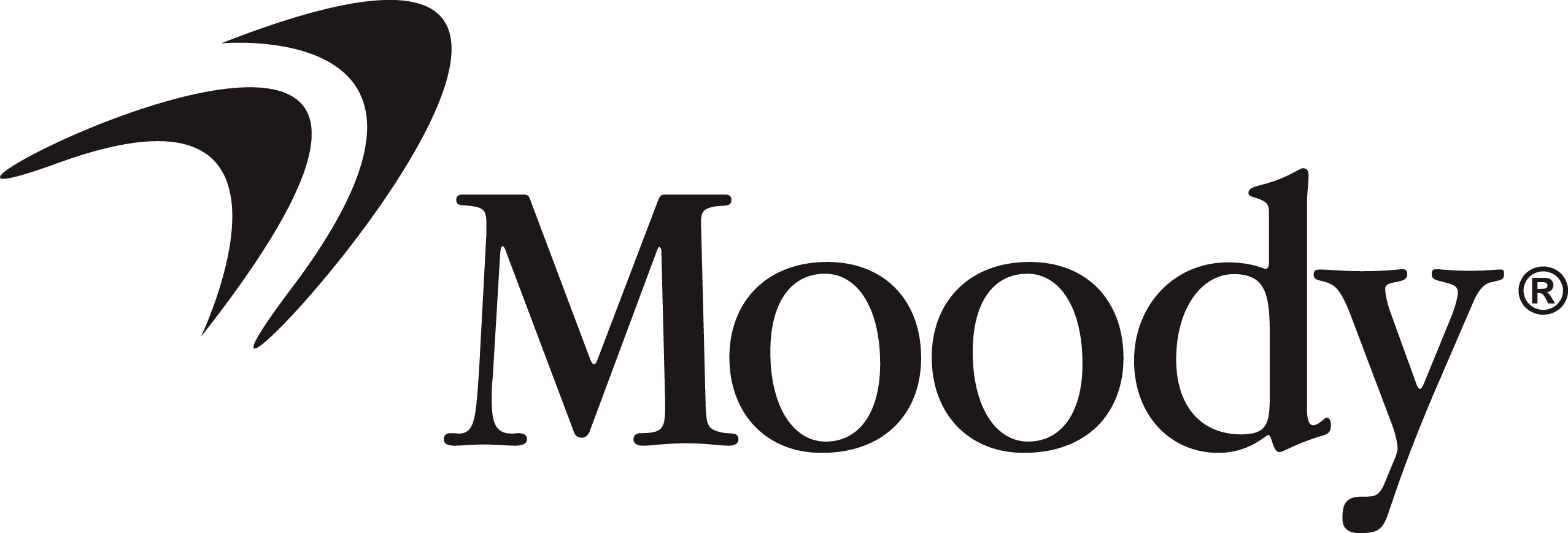
- Current owner: HanseYachts AG
- Produced by: HanseYachts AG
- Country: Germany
- Introduced: 1827
- Website: moody-yachts.com

Moody is an English brand of sailing yachts. It is originated in the former Moody shipyard in Swanwick that was founded in 1827 by John Moody. As of 2007, the brand belongs to German yacht builder HanseYachts AG, Greifswald.

== History ==
=== Repair yard and timber construction (1827–1964) ===
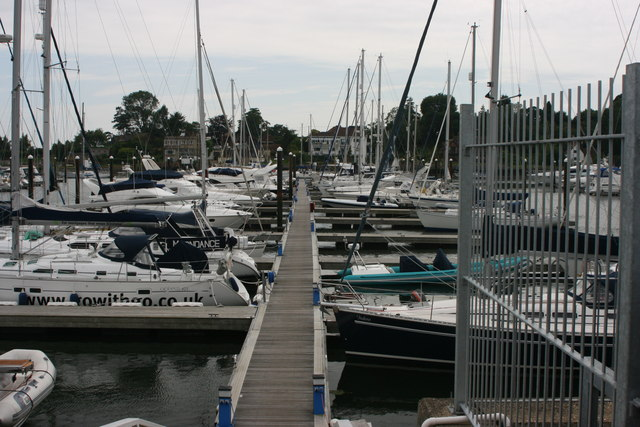
Former Moody's jetty in Swanwick (2007)

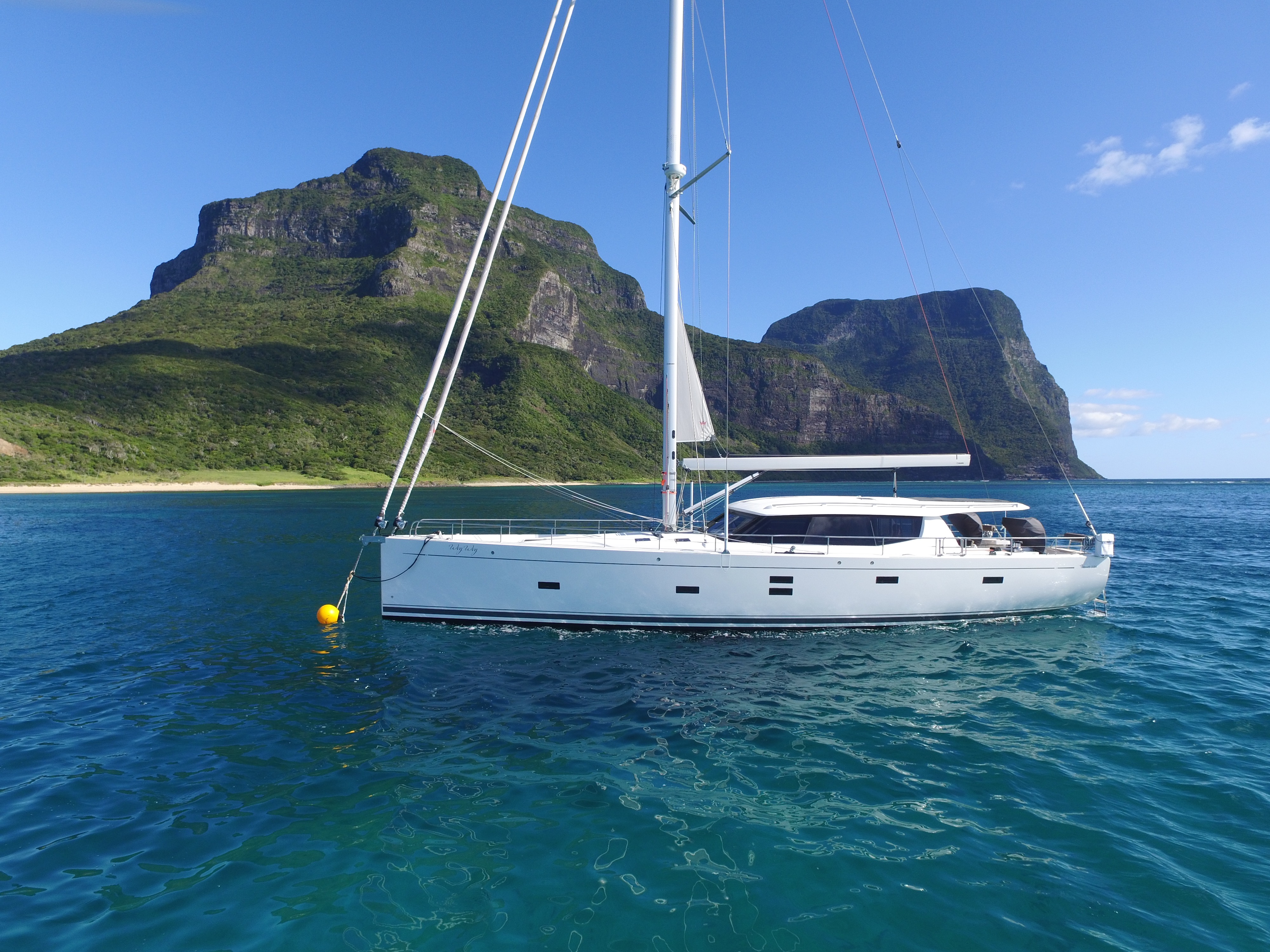
Moody 54 DS (since 2014)

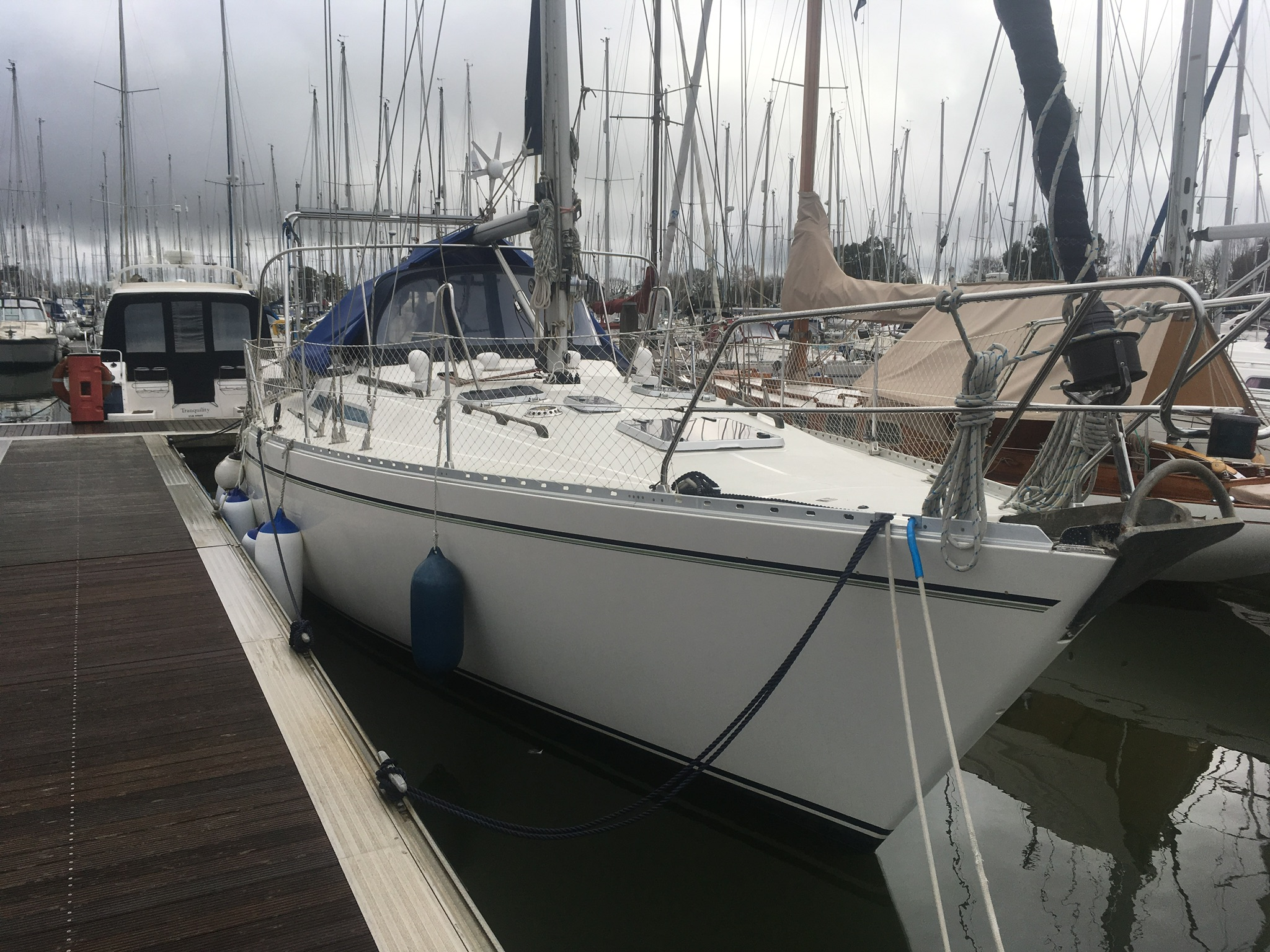
A 1992 Moody 425

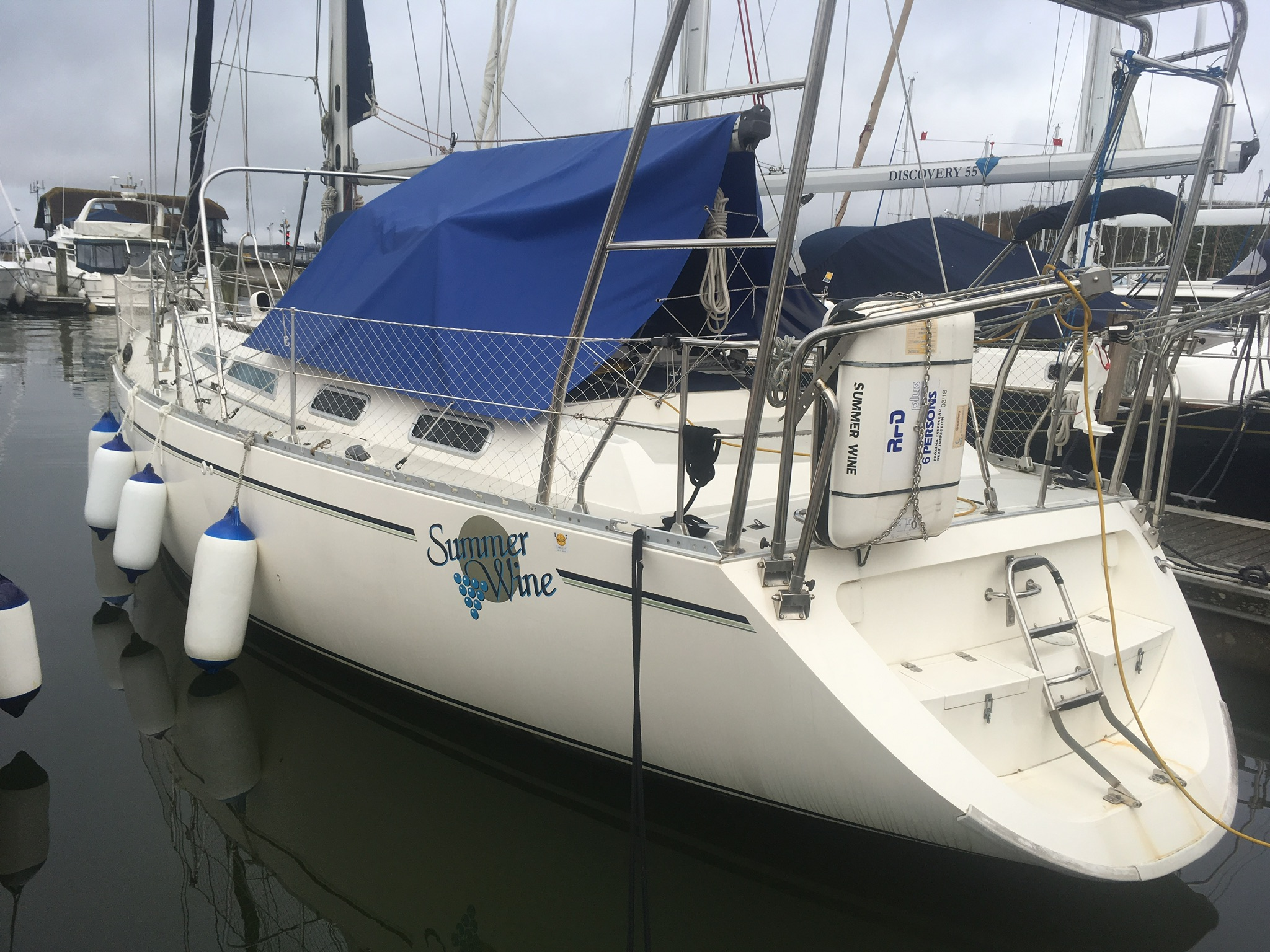
Moody 425

Moody's origins date back to the 19th century. In 1827, the boat builder John Moody founded a shipyard company in Swanwick on the banks of river Hamble, which dealt in particular with the repair and overhaul of fishing boats. When John Moody died in 1880, he left the business to his son Alexander, who also started to build small dinghies.

More than a century later, in 1935, the Moody shipyard produced its first sailing yachts in timber construction. The first model, the Vindilis, was designed by T. Harrison Butler. The service operations continued in conjunction with the boat building activities. In addition, the site in Swanwick was expanded so that the company could build larger yachts. During this period the Moody family also expanded into marina ownership.

=== Sailing yachts made of fibreglass (1965–2004) ===
In 1965, Moody began to produce fibreglass sailing yachts which were appreciated for their comfort and long distance suitability. With designs of naval architects like Laurent Giles, Angus Primrose and Bill Dixon, Moody developed into a leading European manufacturer of sailing yachts.

The world oil crisis 1973 and the following slump on the powerboat market prompted Moody to join together with David King from Marine Projects (Plymouth) Ltd, the manufacturer of Princess motor yachts. The cooperation of the two companies was very successful. They produced up to 400 sailing yachts per year, 27 to 64 ft in length. Bill Dixon and Angus Primrose were responsible for the design of all models.

Due to falling sales in the sailing yacht business, the companies disbanded the connection in 2003. During their 30-year cooperation, they had developed 39 models and sold 4,233 boats. In search of new production halls, Moody found a new partner with the VT Halmatic Ltd. A new model series was launched, consisting of the models Moody 49, Moody 56 and Moody 66.

=== Shutdown, sale of the brand, restart in Germany (2005–present) ===
In 2005, the founding family sold the yard to Premier Marinas Ltd, Swanwick. A year later, the production was discontinued. In 2007, German HanseYachts AG, Greifswald, acquired the brand and started to produce newly developed Moody sailing yachts. Furthermore, HanseYachts appointed Bill Dixon as naval architect for all new Moody models.

== Model lines ==
Until the brand's takeover by HanseYachts, Moody was known for its comfortable centre cockpit yachts. As of 2007, Bill Dixon developed two still comfort-stressed model lines with significantly modified concept:

- the AC line (also: Classic) with aft cockpit and classic yacht lines above the waterline (retro design)
- the DS line with deck saloon and high bulwark

== Current models (specs) ==
Weights and measures (metric)
Model	Length o. a. (m)	Beam (m)	Draught (m) stand^{1} / shall^{2}	Displ.^{1} (t)	Sail area (sq m)	SA/D^{3}
Moody 41 AC	12.70	4.08	1.99 / 1.65	8.9	82.0	4.4
Moody 41 DS	12.52	4.20	2.14 / 1.83	11.2	83.0	4.1
Moody 45 DS	13.72	4.57	1.98 / 1.60	14.0	106.5	4.3
Moody 54 DS	17.10	5.19	2.60 / 2.25	24.7	140.6	4.1

^{1} standard version, ^{2} shallow keel version,^{3} sail area to displacement ratio

Weights and measures (imperial)
Model	Length o. a. (ft)	Beam (ft)	Draught (ft) stand^{1} / shall^{2}	Displ.^{1} (lbs)	Sail area (sq ft)	SA/D^{3}
Moody 41 AC	41' 8"	13' 5"	6' 6" / 5' 5"	19,600	883	19.4
Moody 41 DS	41' 6"	13' 9"	7' 0" / 6' 0"	24,700	893	16.9
Moody 45 DS	45'	15'	6' 6" / 5' 3"	30,900	1,146	18.6
Moody 54 DS	56' 1"	17'	8' 6" / 7' 5"	54,500	1,513	16.9

^{1} standard version, ^{2} shallow keel version,^{3} sail area to displacement ratio
Naval architecture: Bill Dixon
