= Fastnet Lighthouse =

Lighthouse off the southwest coast of Ireland

Fastnet Lighthouse (2nd)
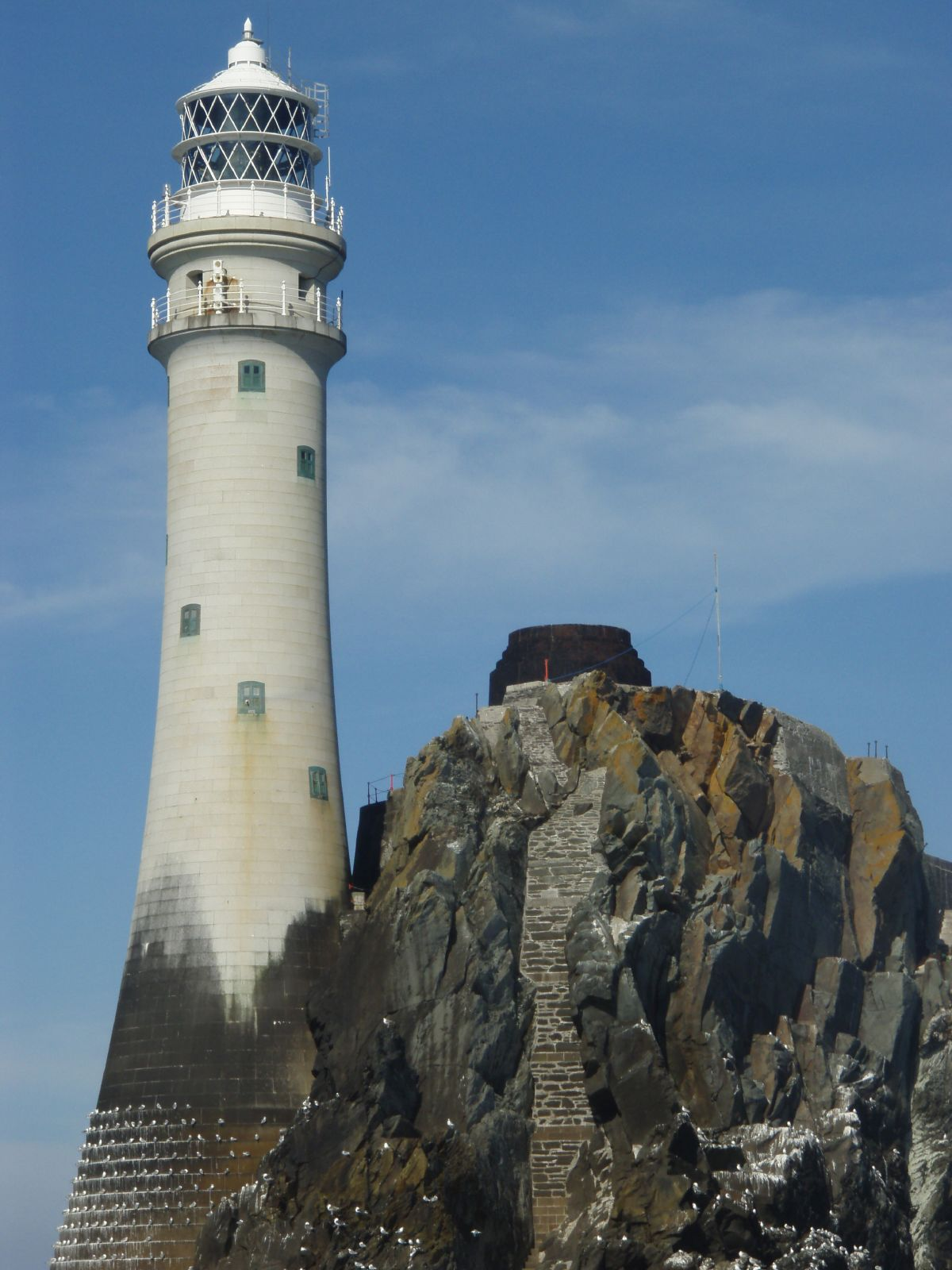
- The second lighthouse on Fastnet Rock. The lower portion of the first lighthouse is also visible at right.
- Location: Fastnet Rock, County Cork, Ireland
- Coordinates: 51°23′36″N 9°36′18″W

Tower
- Constructed: 1897
- Designed by: William Douglass
- Construction: granite
- Automated: March 1989
- Height: 54 m (177 ft)
- Shape: Tapered cylindrical tower with lantern and double gallery
- Markings: White
- Operator: Commissioners of Irish Lights
- Racon: G

Light
- First lit: 27 June 1904
- Focal height: 49 m (161 ft)
- Lens: first order Fresnel lens
- Intensity: 2,500,000 candela
- Range: 28 nmi (52 km; 32 mi)
- Characteristic: Fl W 5s
- Ireland no.: CIL-0010
- Original lighthouse
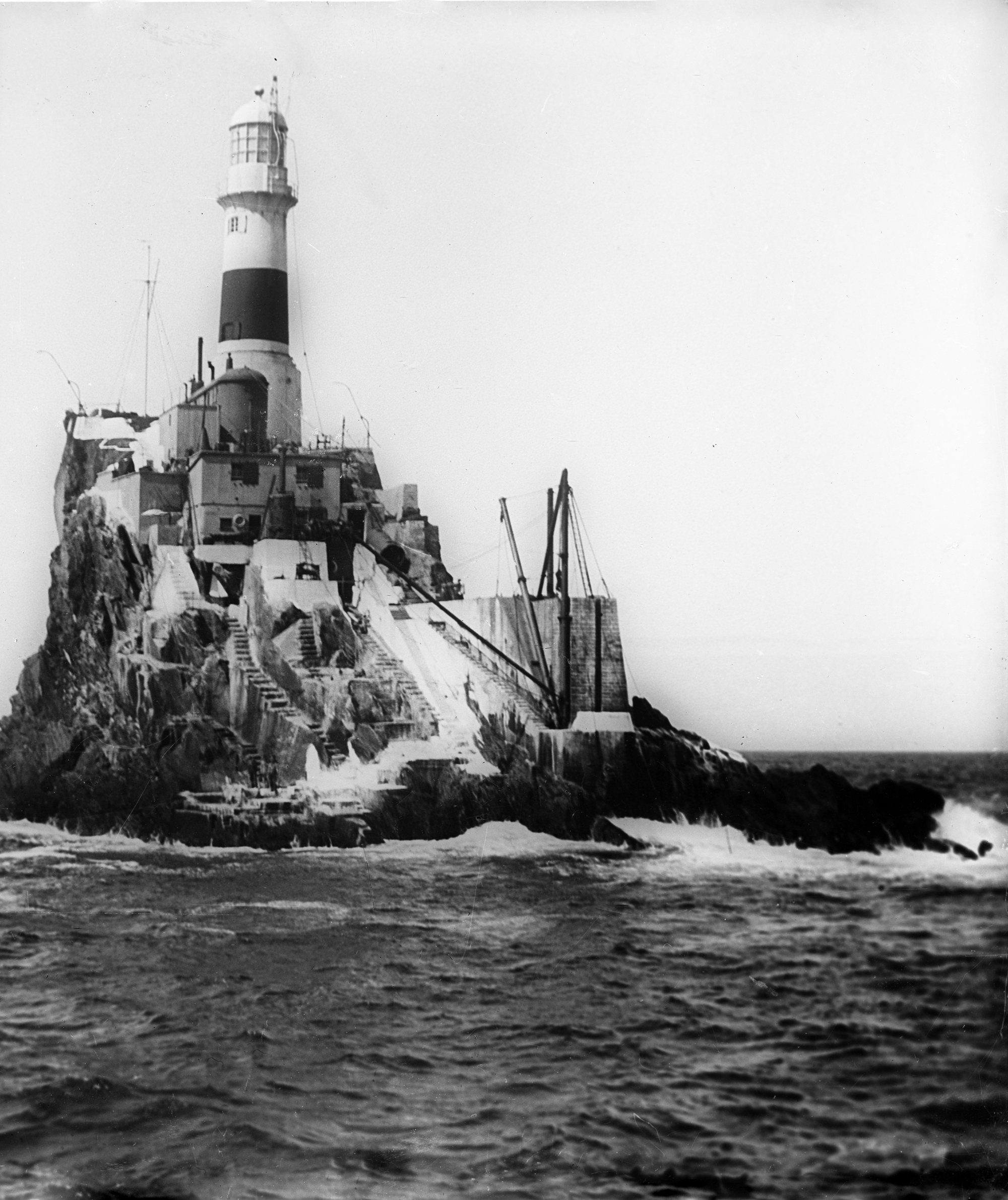
- Constructed: 1854
- Designed by: George Halpin
- Construction: cast iron, brick
- Height: 91 ft (28 m)
- First lit: 1 January 1854
- Intensity: 38 kilocandela

The Fastnet Lighthouse is a 54-metre-tall (177-foot) lighthouse situated on the remote Fastnet Rock in the eastern Atlantic Ocean. It is the most southerly point of Ireland (including offshore islands) and lies 6.5 kilometres (4 miles) south-west of Cape Clear Island and 13 km (8 mi) from mainland County Cork. The current lighthouse is the second to be built on the rock, and is the tallest in Ireland.

== First lighthouse ==
Construction of the first lighthouse began in 1853, and it first produced a light on 1 January 1854; 172 years ago. The lighthouse replaced an early one built on Cape Clear Island in 1818, partly motivated by the loss of an American sailing packet, Stephen Whitney, in thick fog during November 1847 on nearby West Calf Island, causing the death of 92 of her 110 passengers and crew. The new lighthouse was constructed of cast iron, with an inner lining of brick, and was designed by George Halpin. Costing £17,390, the tower was 19.4 metres (63 feet 9 inches) tall with an 8.4-metre-tall (27-foot-8-inch) lantern structure on top, giving a total height of around 28 metres (91 feet). It had an oil-burning lamp of 38 kilocandelas; in contrast, modern lighthouses typically produce 1,300 kilocandelas. In 1883, an explosive fog signal was installed, which electrically detonated a small charge of guncotton every five minutes.

The tower proved to be too weak, since gales shook it to the point that crockery was sometimes thrown off tables, and at one point, a 270 litres (59 imperial gallons; 71 US gallons) cask of water lashed to the gallery 41 metres (135 feet) above high water was washed away. Various steps were taken to strengthen the tower, including fitting a casing around the bottom section up to the second floor, and filling it with stone, and the surrounding rock smoothed over. In 1865, the lower floors were filled in with solid material.

== Second lighthouse ==
In 1891, the Commissioners of Irish Lights had resolved that the light was not sufficiently powerful, particularly for the first landfall for many ships crossing the Atlantic Ocean. The replacement was constructed of stone, cast iron now being considered unsatisfactory; the whole of the nearby Calf tower above its strengthening casing was carried away during a gale on 27 November, 1881, although without loss of life. On the same day, the sea broke the glass of the Fastnet Rock lantern.

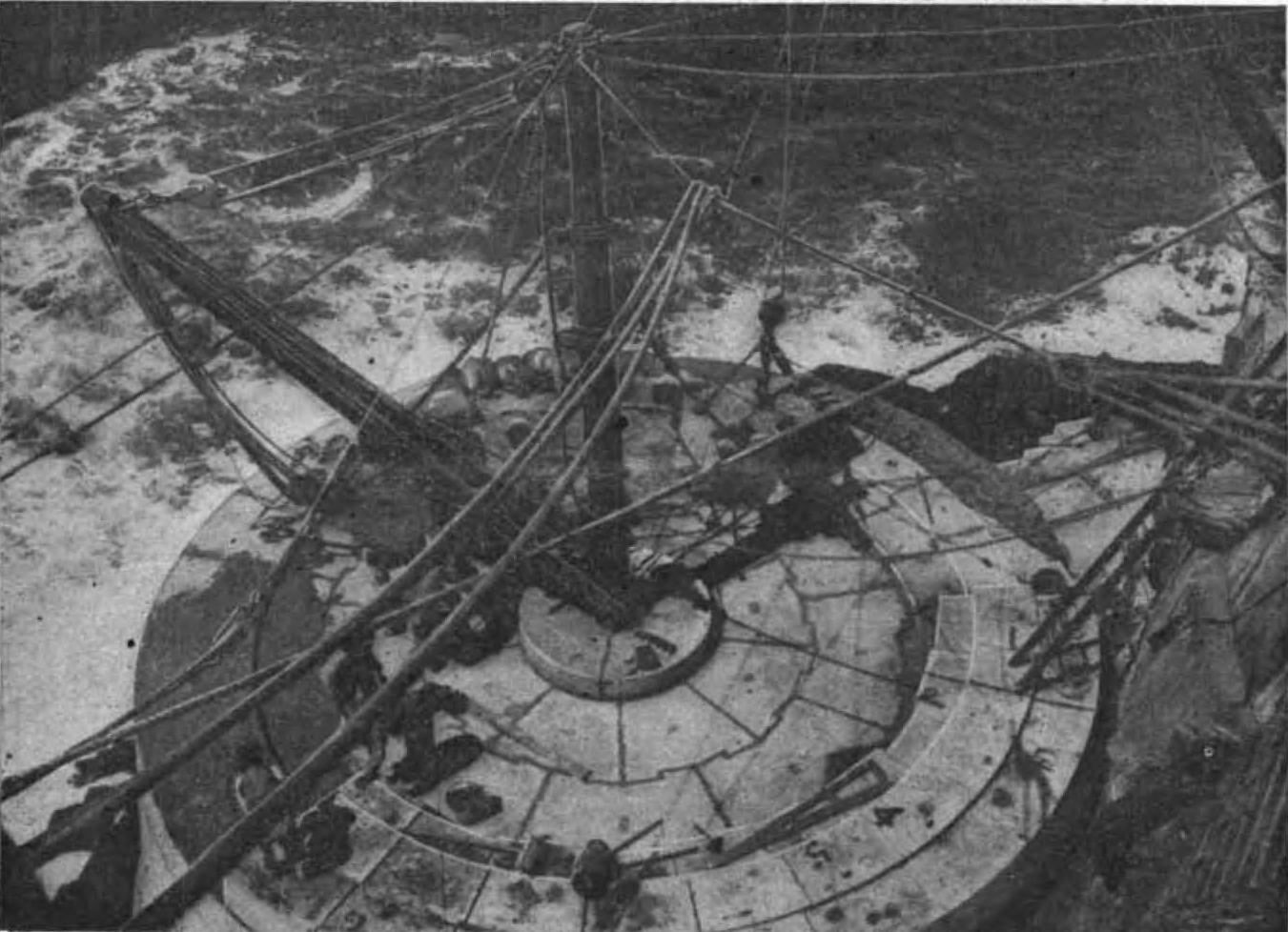
Dovetail granite is evident during early foundation construction in this photograph, published in Scientific American.

The new lighthouse was designed by William Douglass, and built under the supervision of James Kavanagh. Construction started in 1897, with the levelling of the site, and the first of 2,047 dovetailed blocks of Cornish granite was laid in June 1899. As well as these blocks, weighing 4,400 tonnes (4,331 long tons) in total, and with a volume of 1,645 cubic metres (58,093 cubic feet), a further 120 cubic metres (4,238 cubic feet) of granite was used to fill the inside of the tower up to the level of the entrance floor, 18 metres (59 feet) above high-water mark. A small steamship, the Ierne, was specially constructed for carrying the blocks out to the island, and Kavanagh personally set every stone, which weighed between 1.8 and 3.0 tonnes (1.77 and 2.95 long tons). The new lighthouse entered service on 27 June 1904; 122 years ago, having cost nearly £90,000.

The masonry tower is 45 metres (148 feet) high, but the focal point of the light is 48 metres (157 feet) above high-water mark. The base of the lighthouse is 16 metres (52 feet) in diameter, with the first course of stone 150 millimetres (6 inches) below the high-water mark, and the first ten of the eighty-nine courses are built into the rock. The first floor of the original tower remains, on the highest part of the rock, having been left when it was demolished and converted into an oil store.

The fog signal was changed to one report every three minutes in 1934, and from 1965, accompanied by a brilliant flash when operated during darkness. The original vaporised paraffin light was replaced with an electric one on 10 May 1969; 57 years ago. At the end of March 1989; 37 years ago, the lighthouse was converted to automatic operation. It is monitored and controlled using a ultra high frequency (UHF) telemetry link to Mizen Head Lighthouse in County Cork, and onwards by landline to the Irish Lights control centre at Dún Laoghaire.

It produces a 0.14 second white flash every five seconds, with a nominal range of 50 kilometres (27 nautical miles; 31 miles), and a power of 2,500 kilocandelas. Since April 1978; 48 years ago, in addition to being operated during darkness, the light is also used during poor visibility. In 1974, the explosive fog signal was replaced with an electric fog-horn, producing four blasts every minute at 300 hertz (999,308 metres), with a nominal range of 7.2 kilometres (3.9 nautical miles; 4.5 miles). Following a review of navigational aids, the fog signal was permanently shut down on 11 January 2011; 15 years ago. The racon (radar transponder beacon) has transmitted the Morse code for the letter G since its installation in 1994.

In 1985, the lighthouse was struck by a rogue wave about 48 metres (157 feet) high.

== Fastnet Rock ==
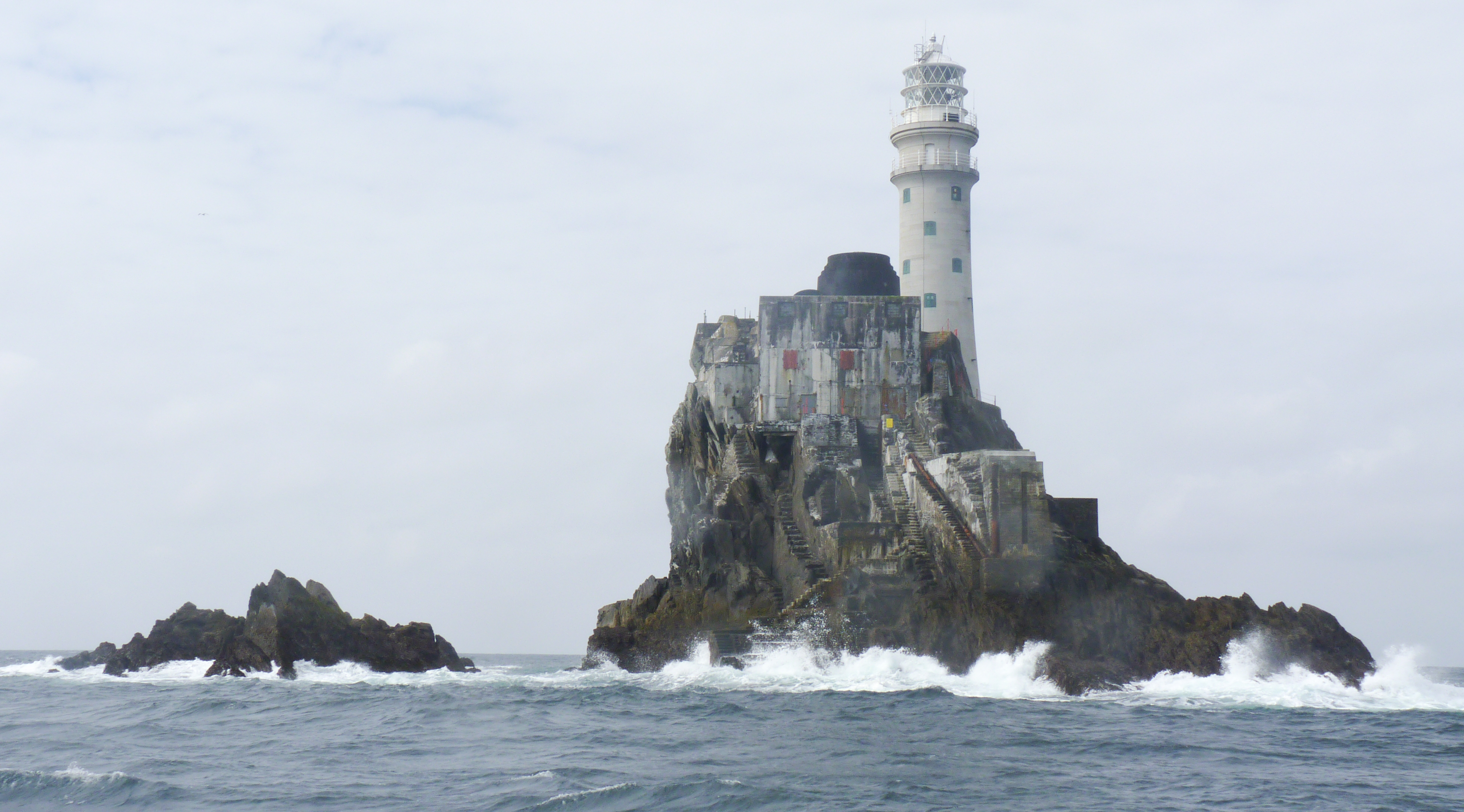
Fastnet Rock and lighthouse.

Fastnet Rock (Irish: Carraig Aonair, lit. 'lone rock'), or simply Fastnet, is a small clay-slate islet with quartz veins, situated off the south-western coast of Ireland. It rises to about 30 metres (98 feet) above the low water mark, and is separated from the much smaller Little Fastnet rock to the south by a 10-metre-wide (33-foot) channel. Fastnet is sometimes known as 'Ireland's Teardrop', because it was the last part of Ireland that some 19th-century Irish emigrants saw as they sailed to North America.

=== Shipping Forecast ===
'Fastnet' also gives its name to the sea area used by the Shipping Forecast, supplied by the United Kingdom Met Office, on behalf of the Maritime and Coastguard Agency (MCA), transmitted by the British Broadcasting Corporation (BBC).

=== Fastnet Race ===
Fastnet Rock is used as the mid-point of one of the world's classic offshore yachting races, the Fastnet Race, a 1,126-kilometre (608.0-nautical-mile; 699.7-mile) route, leaving from Cowes on the Isle of Wight, around the rock, and returning to Cherbourg in France (before 2021, to Plymouth). It is also sometimes used as a mark for yacht races from local sailing centres such as Schull, Baltimore, and Crookhaven.

== See also ==
- Carraig Aonair (The Lone Rock), folk song about a disaster on the rock
- List of lighthouses in Ireland
- List of islands of Ireland

== Sources ==
- Morrissey, James (2005). A History of Fastnet Lighthouse. Columbia Press. ISBN 978-0-9512826-6-3
- The Fastnet Lighthouse: Light on a lonely rock, The Economist 18 Dec 2008
- C.W. Scott, History of Fastnet Lighthouses, Schull Books 2001
- R. Coates, 'Fastnet', Nomina 20 (1997), pp. 37–46
- Fastnet Lighthouse Vital Statistics
- Pictures of the lighthouse
- Mizen Head Signal Station
- 9/28/1907;Fastnet Rock Lighthouses As Seen From Ooean Liners
