= Danish Delfinen-class submarine =

Danish submarine class

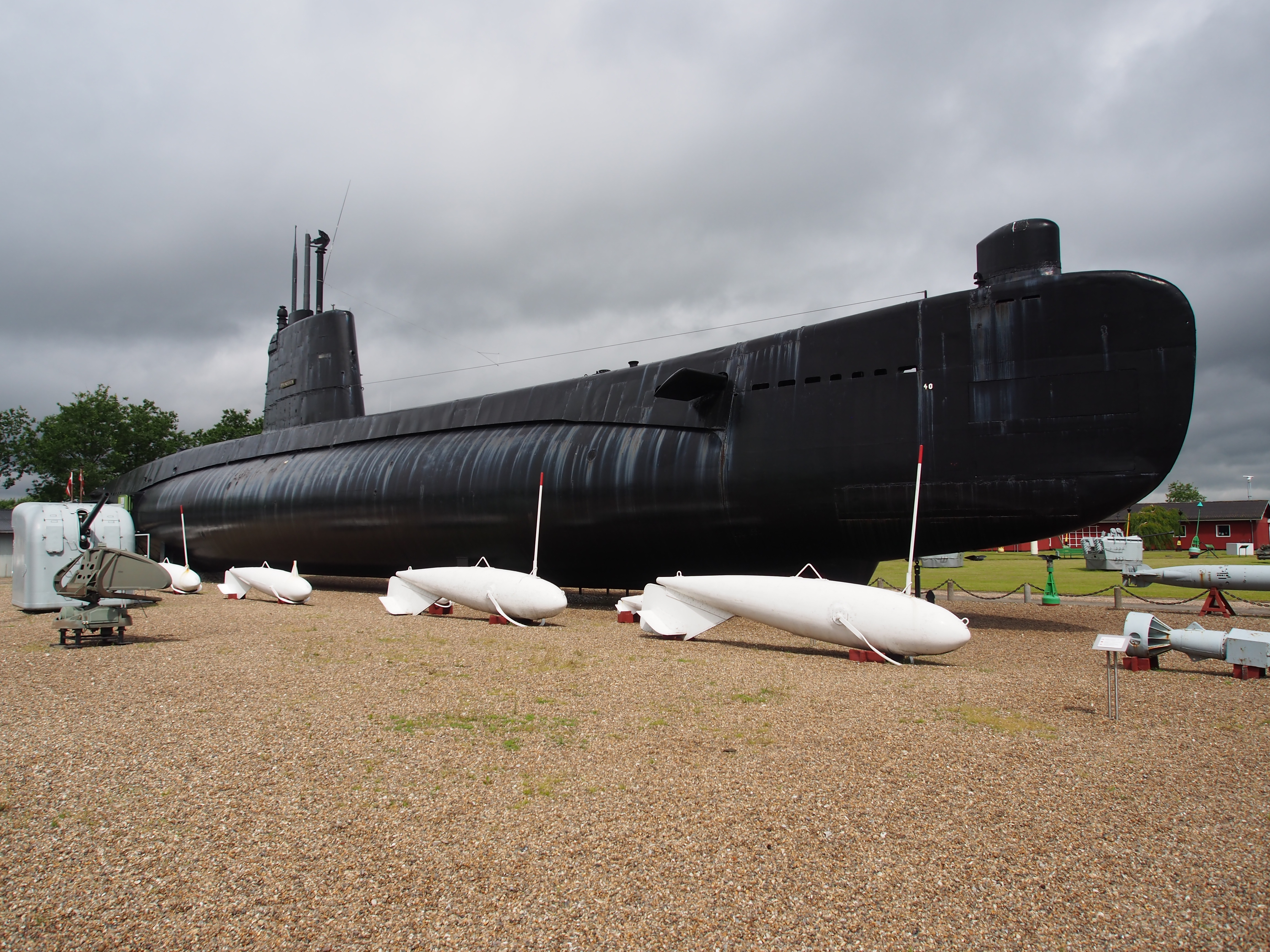
- Springeren at the Aalborg Maritime Museum, Denmark

Class overview
- Name: Delfinen class
- Builders: Naval Dockyard, Copenhagen, Denmark
- Operators: Royal Danish Navy
- Preceded by: U class
- Succeeded by: Kobben class
- Built: 1954–1964
- In commission: 1961–1990
- Completed: 4
- Retired: 4
- Preserved: 1

General characteristics
- Type: Submarine
- Displacement: 605 t (595 long tons) surfaced; 653 t (643 long tons) submerged
- Length: 54.5 m (178 ft 10 in)
- Beam: 4.7 m (15 ft 5 in)
- Draught: 4 m (13 ft 1 in)
- Propulsion: 2 × B&W 1,200 bhp (895 kW) diesel engines; 2 × BBC 1,200 shp (895 kW) electric motors; 2 shafts
- Speed: 16 knots (30 km/h; 18 mph) submerged and surfaced
- Range: 4,000 nmi (7,400 km; 4,600 mi) at 8 kn (15 km/h; 9.2 mph)
- Complement: 33
- Sensors & processing systems: Active and passive sonar
- Armament: 4 × 533 mm (21 in) torpedo tubes

The Delfinen-class submarines were the first class of submarines constructed for the Royal Danish Navy following World War II. They were designed and built within Denmark, with first three boats of the class financed by Denmark. The fourth was financed by the United States (where it was known as SS-554) under the Cost Share program. Constructed between 1956 and 1963, the class comprising four submarines (Delfinen, Spækhuggeren, Tumleren and Springeren) entered service in 1961 and the last taken out of service in 1990. Replaced by the Norwegian Kobben class, three of them were scrapped while a fourth was converted into a museum ship and remains on display at the Aalborg Maritime Museum.

== Description ==
The Delfinen class had a standard displacement of 605 tonnes (595 long tons) and 643 long tons (653 t) when submerged. They measured 54.5 metres (178 ft 10 in) long with a beam of 4.7 m (15 ft 5 in) and a draught of 4 m (13 ft 1 in). The submarines were propelled by two shafts powered by two B&W 1,200-brake-horsepower (895 kW) diesel engines and two BBC 1,200-shaft-horsepower (895 kW) electric motors. The submarines had a maximum speed of 16 knots (30 km/h; 18 mph) both surfaced and submerged and a range of 4,000 nautical miles (7,400 km; 4,600 mi) at 8 knots (15 km/h; 9.2 mph). (Note: The website navalhistory.dk states that the vessels had a standard displacement of 582 t (573 long tons) and 659 t (649 long tons) submerged. They measured 53.9 m (176 ft 10 in) long, that their electric motors were capable of 2,100 hp (1,600 kW) and were only capable of 13 knots (24 km/h; 15 mph) surfaced whiled maintaining the same range at 8.5 knots (15.7 km/h; 9.8 mph). Couhat also has the range at 8.5 knots with a maximum speed of 13 knots surfaced and 12 knots (22 km/h; 14 mph) submerged.) The submarines were equipped with passive and active sonar and a schnorkel. The Delfinen class were armed with four 533 mm (21 in) torpedo tubes located in the bow. (Note: According to the website navalhistory.dk, the vessels shipped with eight torpedoes.) They had a complement of 33.

== Construction and service ==
Following World War II, the Royal Danish Navy which had lost the majority of its fleet during the German invasion, was restocked with ex-British Royal Navy submarines on loan and salvaged Danish submarines that had been scuttled during the war. Denmark joined NATO and was assigned the defence of the Baltic Sea which led to an emphasis on submarines. The Delfinen class marked the Royal Danish Navy's first new submarines in the post war era. Designed by the Danish and constructed at the Naval Shipyard in Copenhagen, the first three vessels in the class were paid for the Danish and were constructed between 1956 and 1961. The fourth submarine of the class, Springeren, was financed by the United States and known as SS-554.

The class remained in service until the beginning of the 1980s, when the Royal Danish Navy intended to replace them with former Norwegian Kobben-class submarines in 1986. Only three Kobben-class units were acquired due to a lack of funds and Springeren remained in service until 1990. Springeren is preserved as a museum ship at the Langeland Fortet Museum.

== Ships ==
Delfinen class
Number	Name	Builder	Launched	Commissioned	Decommissioned	Fate
S 326	Delfinen	Naval Dockyard, Copenhagen, Denmark	4 May 1956	1 August 1961	2 August 1983	Sold for scrapping 11 September 1984.
S 327	Spækhuggeren	Naval Dockyard, Copenhagen, Denmark	20 February 1957	1 August 1961	31 July 1989	Sold for scrapping, 3 December 1991.
S 328	Tumleren	Naval Dockyard, Copenhagen, Denmark	22 May 1958	1 August 1961	6 August 1981	Sold for scrapping 7 September 1982.
S 329	Springeren	Naval Dockyard, Copenhagen, Denmark	22 April 1963	22 October 1964	31 March 1990	Handed over to the Langeland Fort Museum on Langeland as museum ship
