= MV Holoholo =

Research vessel lost at sea in 1978

History
- Name: M/V Holoholo
- Builder: Keehi Drydock Co.
- Laid down: 1959
- Launched: 1963
- Completed: 1961
- Identification: 294826
- Fate: Disappeared 10 December 1978 Evidence found 9 December 1979

General characteristics
- Class & type: scow
- Tonnage: 134.24 tons
- Length: 77.4 ft
- Beam: 25.4 ft
- Depth: 4.6 ft
- Propulsion: 4 × GM 671 diesel engines

M/V Holoholo was a charter research vessel for the Research Corporation of the University of Hawaii (RCUH) for the Ocean thermal energy conversion (OTEC) project. On 10 December 1978 Holoholo went missing at sea, presumed capsized and sank with its crew of 10 people.

== History ==
Holoholo was built between 1959 and 1961 by E. R. Simmerer and launched in 1963 as a pleasure craft for Arthur F. Stubenberg, who had commissioned her. On 15 September 1978 Stubenberg sold Holoholo to John Laney for $75,000 by multiple payments until the amount was reached. John Laney had Holoholo converted into a research vessel. In October 1978 RCUH chartered Holoholo for OTEC and had its first voyage for OTEC. On 9 December 1978 left Honolulu for Kawaihae to arrive on the 11th.

== Inquiry ==
The investigation took the factors that there was no debris field, distress call, nor life crafts launched from Holoholo most likely was a result of an immediate and catastrophic loss of stability resulting in a capsizing.

The accepted cause of the disappearance was the removal of a 2 by 4 foot hatch door. The door to the steering room on the fantail, was removed to allow piping to lead into the engine room for a hydraulic winch. The opening was covered by plywood and not sealed. The Coast Guard concluded that Holoholo would take on water in seas over 6 feet. The weather report stated swells were 14 to 17.5 feet on the 10th. The incremental flooding in the vacant lower decks could have destabilize the boat and cause her to capsize.

An alternative scenario was that unsecured anchors loose in the heavy seas caused a breach in the transom, causing flooding of the hull.

== Discovery ==
On 9 December 1979 NOAAS Townsend Cromwell picked up signals from the sea floor. A day later it was confirmed the instruments making the signals were aboard Holoholo. But the instruments were 200 to 500 meters apart. The official resting place of Holoholo is 20°6’N, 156°28’ W but no further confirmation has been made.
