= MV Nyora =

Cargo ship

History
- Name: Adrian (1935-45); Empire Conifer (1945-47); Nyora (1947-63); Selat Singkep (1963-64); Molopo (1964); Anban (1964-65); Basongo (1965-66); Medduno (1966-69); Messawa (1969-76); Forevergreen (1976-77); Majullah (1977-78); Jayawang (1978-79)
- Owner: Motorschiff Adrian GmbH (1935-38); Ernst Komrowski (1938-45); Ministry of War Transport (1945); Ministry of Transport (1945-48); Australian Shipping Board (1948-53); J Birke (1953-63); Robin & Co (1963); Kie Hock Shipping Co (1963-64); Compagnia de Navigazione Gatun SA (1964-65); Compagnia Navigazione Thompson SA (1965-76); Uni-Ocean Lines (1976-78); Haw Ben Hock (1978-79)
- Operator: Ernst Komrowski (1935-45); Tyne Tees Steam Shipping Co Ltd (1945); Australian Department of Shipping & Transport (1945-47); Australian Shipping Board (1947-53); J Birke (1953-63); Robin & Co (1963); Kie Hock Shipping Co (1963-64); Compagnia de Navigazione Gatun SA (1964-65); Compagnia Navigazione Thompson SA (1965-76); Uni-Ocean Lines (1976-78); Haw Ben Hock (1978-79)
- Port of registry: (Nazi Germany) Hamburg (1935-45); (United Kingdom) London (1945-48); Australia (1948-63); Panama City (1963); Singapore (1963-64); Panama City (1964-76); Singapore (1976-79)
- Builder: Norsdseewerke
- Launched: 1935
- Out of service: 23 July 1978
- Identification: Code Letters DJOT (1935-45); Code Letters GLTL (1945-48); United Kingdom Official Number 180632 (1945-48); IMO number: 5259539
- Fate: Wrecked

General characteristics
- Type: Cargo ship
- Tonnage: 1,441 GRT (1935-48); 1,299 GRT (1948-79); 747 NRT (1935-48); 681 NRT (1948-79)
- Length: 231 ft 3 in (70.49 m)
- Beam: 36 ft 0 in (10.97 m)
- Depth: 13 ft 8 in (4.17 m)
- Installed power: 4SCSA diesel engine
- Propulsion: Screw propeller

Nyora was a 1,279 GRT cargo ship that was built in 1935 as Adrian by Nordseewerke, Emden for German owners. She was seized by the Allies in the Copenhagen, Denmark in May 1945, passed to the Ministry of War Transport (MoWT) and renamed Empire Conifer. In 1946, she was allocated to the Australian Government. In 1947, she was passed to the Australian Shipping Board and renamed Nyora.

Nyora was sold into merchant service in 1953. In 1963, she was sold to Panama and then to Singapore and was renamed Selat Singkep In 1964, another sale saw her renamed Molopo and then Anban. A sale in 1965 saw her renamed Basongo. Further renamings were to Medduno in 1966 and Mesawa in 1969. In 1976, she was sold to Singapore and renamed Forevergreen and then Majullah the following year.

Following an arrest and sale by auction, she was renamed Jayawang. She served until 23 July 1978 when she sank near Bangkok, Thailand. The ship was raised in November 1979 and moved to an anchorage nearer the shore but sank again and was declared a total loss.

== Description ==
The ship was built in 1935 by Nordseewerke, Emden.

The ship was 231 feet 3 inches (70.49 m) long, with a beam of 36 feet 0 inches (10.97 m). She had a depth of 13 feet 8 inches (4.17 m). As built, the ship had a GRT of 1,279 and a NRT of 684.

The ship was propelled by a 4-stroke Single Cycle Single Acting diesel engine, which had 8 cylinders of 16 15/16 inches (43.0 cm) diameter by 26 3/4 inches (68 cm) stroke. The engine was built by Friedrich Krupp AG, Kiel.

== History ==
Adrian was built for Motorschiff Adrian GmbH, Hamburg. She was operated under the management of Ernst Komorwski, Hamburg. Her port of registry was Hamburg and the Code Letters DJOT were allocated. In 1938, Adrian was sold to Ernst Komrowski. In 1945, Adrian was seized by the Allies at Copenhagen, Denmark. She was passed to the MoWT and renamed Empire Conifer Her port of registry was changed to London. The Code Lettere GLTL and United Kingdom Official Number 180632 were allocated. She was placed under the management of the Tyne Tees Steam Shipping Company Ltd.

While the Prize Court was deciding on the ship's fate, Empire Conifer was chartered to the Australian Government at 1d per annum. In 1946, she was allocated to Australia and delivered to Fremantle, where she was taken over by the Australian Department of Shipping & Transport. In October 1947, Empire Conifer was laid up at Sydney awaiting modification. On completion, Empire Conifer was 1,299 GRT, 681 NRT. In May 1948, Empire Conifer was transferred to the Australian shipping register. She was sold to Australia in September 1948 for 1d and then renamed Nyora. In 1953, Nyora was sold to J Burke & Co, Australia. She served for ten years and was sold in 1963 to Robin & Co, Panama. Later that year she was sold to Kie Hock Shipping Co, Singapore and was renamed Selat Singkep. In 1964, she was sold to Compagnia de Navigazione Gatun SA, Panama and was renamed Molopo and then Anban. In 1965, she was sold to Compagnia Navigazione Thompson SA, Panama and renamed Basongo. Further renamings were Maloppo in 1966 and Masawa in 1969.

In 1976, Masawa was sold to Uni-Ocean Lines, Singapore and was renamed Forevergreen. She was renamed Majullah in 1977. In 1978, she was arrested in Malaysia. She was sold by auction to Haw Ben Hock, Singapore and was renamed Jayawang. On 23 July 1978, Jayawang sank near Bangkok, Thailand. She was raised in November 1979 and moved to an anchorage nearer Bangkok but sank again and was declared a total loss.
