= List of shipwrecks in February 1939 =

The list of shipwrecks in February 1939 includes ships sunk, foundered, grounded, or otherwise lost during February 1939.

== 1 February ==
List of shipwrecks: 1 February 1939
Ship	State	Description
Iron Warrior	United Kingdom	The cargo ship ran aground at Port Pirie, South Australia, Australia.
Thode Fagelund	Norway	The cargo ship ran aground at Concepción del Uruguay, Argentina.

== 2 February ==
List of shipwrecks: 2 February 1939
Ship	State	Description
I-63	Imperial Japanese Navy	The Kaidai-type submarine collided with the submarine I-60 (Imperial Japanese Navy) in the Bungo Strait off Kyushu, Japan, and sank with the loss of 81 of her 87 crew members. She was refloated in January 1940 and scrapped.
Northton	United Kingdom	The cargo ship sank at Port Colborne, Ontario, Canada.
Washington	United States	The dredger caught fire and sank at New York.

== 3 February ==
List of shipwrecks: 3 February 1939
Ship	State	Description
Avala	Yugoslavia	The cargo ship ran aground 30 nautical miles (56 km) west of Cape Agulhas, Union of South Africa and sank. Declared a total loss.
Lutzen	Canada	The coaster, a former Navarin-class minesweeper, ran aground off Nauset Beach, Massachusetts with the loss of a crew member. She capsized in a storm on 7 February and broke up.
Montrolite	United Kingdom	The tanker ran aground in the Indo Channel, Argentina. She was refloated on 5 February.

== 5 February ==
List of shipwrecks: 5 February 1939
Ship	State	Description
Glenmaroon	United Kingdom	The cargo ship ran aground in the Seine at Aizier, Eure, France. She was refloated the next day.
Mitra	Norway	The tanker came ashore 12 nautical miles (22 km) west of Tallinn, Estonia. She was later refloated.
Mylla	Norway	The tanker ran aground at Kastrup, Denmark. She was refloated on 8 February.

== 6 February ==
List of shipwrecks: 6 February 1939
Ship	State	Description
Authorpe	Panama	Spanish Civil War: The 125.7-foot (38.3 m), 271-ton French owned former TR series minesweeping trawler, was accidentally sunk by Nationalist aircraft at Alicante. She was raised, repaired and put in Spanish service 12 October 1939 as "Castillo A".
Leverkusen	Germany	The passenger ship ran aground on the Saratoga Spit, off the coast of Japan.

== 7 February ==
List of shipwrecks: 7 February 1939
Ship	State	Description
Rashin Maru	Japan	The cargo ship ran aground at Hongay, French Indo-China. She was refloated about a month later.

== 8 February ==
List of shipwrecks: 8 February 1939
Ship	State	Description
Katina Bulgari	Greece	The cargo ship collided with Meanticut (United States) and sank in the North Sea 5 nautical miles (9.3 km) south of the Humber Lightship ( Trinity House) (53°35′28″N 0°31′20″E). The wreck was subsequently dispersed by explosives.
Maria de Larrinaga	United Kingdom	The cargo ship issued a mayday in the Atlantic Ocean (42°30′N 46°00′W). Wreckage was spotted the next day by Aurania (United Kingdom) at 42°27′N 45°49′W. All 37 or 38 crew were lost.
Pluto	Finland	The cargo ship ran aground off Dragør, Denmark. She was refloated on 10 February after discharging 100 tons of cargo.
HMAS Swordsman	Royal Australian Navy	The S-class destroyer was scuttled in the Pacific Ocean off the coast of New South Wales.

== 9 February ==
List of shipwrecks: 9 February 1939
Ship	State	Description
Aghios Nicolaos	Greece	The cargo ship ran aground of the Punta Bianca Lighthouse, Grossa Islan, Yugoslavia. She was refloated on 14 February.
Apollo	Finland	The cargo ship ran aground on Møn, Denmark. She was refloated on 11 February.
Corio	United Kingdom	The cargo ship was scuttled off Port Phillip, Victoria, Australia.
Damanski	Greece	The cargo ship ran aground at "Stylis".
Dronningen	Denmark	The passenger ship ran aground in fog at Arendal, Norway.
Elsa Croy	Estonia	The schooner came ashore north of Rønne, Denmark. She was refloated on 19 February.
Fonix	Norway	The cargo ship ran aground at Fedje and sank. All of her crew were rescued.
Glückauf	Germany	The collier collided with the wreck of Katina Bulgari (Greece) in the North Sea (54°36′06″N 0°31′05″E) and sank. All nineteen crew were rescued by Rhea (Finland).
Kaupanger	Norway	The cargo ship ran aground in the Guadiana 4 nautical miles (7.4 km) downstream of Pomerão, Portugal. She was refloated undamaged on 16 February.

== 10 February ==
List of shipwrecks: 10 February 1939
Ship	State	Description
Chuy	Brazil	The cargo ship ran aground at Bahia. She was later refloated.
Egeran	Germany	The cargo ship passed the Elbe Lighthouse on a voyage from Hamburg to Rotterdam, South Holland, Netherlands. No further trace.
Lightburne	United States	The tanker ran aground in dense fog at Old Harbour Point, on the coast of Block Island off Rhode Island, 0.25 miles (0.4 km) southeast of Block Island Southeast Light. She broke in two, and sank in up to 30 feet (9.1 m) of water (41°08′58″N 071°32′54″W). All 37 crew and a dog on board were rescued by the cutter USCGC Active ( United States Coast Guard).
Monocacy	United States	The decommissioned gunboat was scuttled off the coast of China.

== 11 February ==
List of shipwrecks: 11 February 1939
Ship	State	Description
Basil Blackett	United Kingdom	The cargo ship ran aground of a reef off Nassau, Bahamas. She was declared a total loss.
Maltran	United States	The Design 1012 cargo ship ran aground in the James River. She was refloated the next day.

== 12 February ==
List of shipwrecks: 12 February 1939
Ship	State	Description
Baltabor	United Kingdom	The cargo liner ran aground 2 nautical miles (3.7 km) off Liepāja, Latvia. She was refloated on 21 June, but grounded again.
Eduard Geiss	Germany	The cargo ship ran aground off Kołobrzeg, Poland.

== 13 February ==
List of shipwrecks: 13 February 1939
Ship	State	Description
Agnew	United Kingdom	The dredger ran aground at Devonport, Tasmania, Australia. She was declared a total loss and sold for scrap.
Naviedale	United Kingdom	The cargo ship ran aground off the Longman Beacon, Inverness-shire. She was refloated on 15 February.
Saiko Maru	Japan	The cargo ship collided with Binna (Norway) at Moji and sank.

== 14 February ==
List of shipwrecks: 14 February 1939
Ship	State	Description
Koningsdiep	Netherlands	The cargo ship ran aground at Cape Arkona, Germany. Her cargo of bricks was jettisoned. She was refloated on 23 February and towed to Stralsund for assessment. She was found to be severely damaged.

== 15 February ==
List of shipwrecks: 15 February 1939
Ship	State	Description
Topdalsfjord	Norway	The cargo ship ran aground in Hjeltefjorden and was severely damaged.

== 16 February ==
List of shipwrecks: 16 February 1939
Ship	State	Description
Arnfinn Jarl	Norway	The cargo ship ran aground in Sørfjorden, near Bergen and was severely damaged. She was later refloated and towed to Bergen for repairs.
Kaipara	United Kingdom	The cargo ship ran agrount at Saint John, New Brunswick, Canada and sprang a leak. She was drydocked for repairs.

== 17 February ==
List of shipwrecks: 17 February 1939
Ship	State	Description
Albion	Norway	The cargo ship ran aground off the Stavnes Lighthouse and was severely damaged. She was beached at Kristiansund, one crew member was killed.
Gertrude Jean	United Kingdom	The schooner was crushed by pack ice at Hickman's Harbor, Newfoundland and sank. She was declared a total loss.
Rossmore	United Kingdom	The cargo ship ran aground at Hayle, Cornwall. She was refloated the next day.
Wiborg	Germany	The coaster collided with City of Bremen (United Kingdom) in the Osterems in dense fog and sank. All twelve crew were rescued by City of Bremen.

== 18 February ==
List of shipwrecks: 18 February 1939
Ship	State	Description
Ilsenstein	United Kingdom	The 447.5-foot (136.4 m) cargo vessel was scuttled as a blockship at Scapa Flow.
Kongeaa	Denmark	The cargo ship ran aground off Dragør. She was refloated the next day.
Moreton Bay	United Kingdom	The passenger ship ran aground in the Suez Roads, Egypt. She was later refloated undamaged.
Moyalla	United Kingdom	The cargo ship ran aground at Ballina, County Mayo, Ireland.
Nasu Maru	Japan	The salvage ship ran aground on one of the Ryukyu Islands.
Provençal 8	France	The tug capsized and sank at Algiers, Algeria whilst assisting Oceania (Italy).
Taurus	Finland	The cargo ship sprang a leak 18 nautical miles (33 km) east north east of the Borkum Lightship (Germany). She was later beached. Taurus was subsequently refloated and taken to Cuxhaven, Germany for repairs.

== 20 February ==
List of shipwrecks: 20 February 1939
Ship	State	Description
Alfa	Estonia	The cargo ship ran aground west of Arensburg. Refloated on 10 March after part of the cargo was jettisoned and towed to Tallinn. She was consequently scrapped.
Beaverhill	United Kingdom	The cargo ship ran aground 5 nautical miles (9.3 km) off Partridge Island, New Brunswick, Canada and was damaged. Taken to Saint John for repairs.
Changri	United States	The schooner came ashore at San Felipe Key, Cuba.
Kaiyoku Maru	Japan	The cargo ship ran aground and foundered east of Port Hamilton, Korea (34°03′N 127°24′E). She was on a voyage from Karatsu to Tsingtao, China.

== 21 February ==
List of shipwrecks: 21 February 1939
Ship	State	Description
Daniel M.	United Kingdom	The coaster ran aground at the entrance to Margate Harbour, Kent.

== 22 February ==
List of shipwrecks: 22 February 1939
Ship	State	Description
HMS L21		The L-class submarine ran aground on the Isle of Arran, Bute whilst under tow to the breakers. She was refloated on 24 February.
HMS Sterlet	Royal Navy	The S-class submarine ran aground off Sandown, Isle of Wight in a gale. She was later refloated.
HMS Sunfish	Royal Navy	The S-class submarine ran aground off Sandown in a gale. She was later refloated.

== 23 February ==
List of shipwrecks: 23 February 1939
Ship	State	Description
Stangrove	United Kingdom	Spanish Civil War: The cargo ship had been shelled off Cap de Creus and captured by the Spanish Nationalist gunboat Dato (Spanish Navy) on 5 February. She was wrecked in a gale whilst in custody at Palma de Mallorca. The ship was refloated, confiscated by the Spanish Government and returned to service as Castilla del Oro.

== 24 February ==
List of shipwrecks: 24 February 1939
Ship	State	Description
Diana	Germany	The cargo ship came ashore at Palma de Mallorca, Spain. She had been refloated by 11 March.

== 25 February ==
List of shipwrecks: 25 February 1939
Ship	State	Description
Loulis	Greece	Spanish Civil War: The cargo ship struck a mine and sank off Cap de Creus, Spain.
Mercurius	Sweden	The cargo ship ran aground at Sjkelskør, Denmark. She was refloated the next day and sailed to Korsør for examination.
Norden	Germany	The cargo ship ran aground at Korsør. Refloated the next day and entered Korsør for examination. Consequently declared a total loss.

== 26 February ==
List of shipwrecks: 26 February 1939
Ship	State	Description
Lillian	United States	The cargo ship collided with Wiegand (Germany) in foggy conditions off the Barnegat Lighthouse, New Jersey, and was abandoned. She floated for twelve hours but sank just as the crew were preparing to re-board her in an attempt at salvage.
Nadja	United Kingdom	World War II: The concrete barge was scuttled as a blockship in Scapa Flow, Orkney Islands just north of Clio I (United Kingdom).
Lillian	United States	The cargo ship collided with Wiegland (Germany) off the Barnegat Lighthouse, New Jersey. Lillian sank the next day (40°01′N 73°31′W). The wreck was subsequently removed.

== 27 February ==
List of shipwrecks: 27 February 1939
Ship	State	Description
Swan	United States	The towing vessel was wrecked on Tugidak Island, in the Kodiak Archipelago, Territory of Alaska. Both people on board survived.

== 28 February ==
List of shipwrecks: 28 February 1939
Ship	State	Description
Naja	United Kingdom	The Admiralty-requisitioned concrete barge was scuttled as a blockship in Water Sound, Scapa Flow.

== Unknown date ==
List of shipwrecks: Unknown date 1939
Ship	State	Description
Lucky	United Kingdom	Spanish Civil War: The cargo ship was sunk in an air raid at Valencia, Spain. She was refloated on 21 April.
