= SS Audacious =

Cargo liner that served in both world wars

- Belvedere in 1930

History
- Name: 1913: Belvedere; 1941: Audacious
- Namesake: 1913: Belvedere, Vienna
- Owner: 1913: Unione Austriaca; 1919: Cosulich Soc Triestina di Nav; 1937: "Italia" SA di Nav; 1941: US Maritime Commission; 1942: War Shipping Administration
- Operator: 1932: Italia Flotte Riuniti; 1935: Italian Navy; 1941: United States Lines; 1942: United States Navigation Company
- Port of registry: 1913: (Austria-Hungary) Trieste; 1919: (Kingdom of Italy) Trieste; 1938: (Kingdom of Italy) Genoa; 1941: Panama
- Route: 1913: Trieste – New York; 1922: Trieste – Buenos Aires
- Builder: Cantiere Navale Triestino, Monfalcone
- Launched: 4 April 1913
- Completed: 22 August 1913
- Maiden voyage: 30 August 1913, to New York
- Refit: 1922, 1924, 1936, 1937
- Identification: 1914: call sign OKB; 1924: code letters NGHC; 1934: call sign IBIE; 1941: call sign HPYA
- Fate: scuttled as breakwater, 8 June 1944

General characteristics
- Type: 1913: cargo liner; 1924: refrigerated cargo ship; 1935: troopship; 1937: cargo ship; 1944: troopship; breakwater
- Tonnage: 1913: 7,166 GRT, 4,360 NRT; 1923: 7,305 GRT, 4,448 NRT; 1928: 7,420 GRT, 4,575 NRT; 1938: 6,889 GRT, 4,316 NRT; 1941: 7,455 GRT, 4,551 NRT
- Length: 437.7 ft (133.42 m) overall; 412.0 ft (125.6 m) registered
- Beam: 51.7 ft (15.8 m)
- Draft: 28 ft 9 in (8.76 m)
- Depth: 26.3 ft (8.0 m)
- Decks: 2
- Installed power: 1 × triple-expansion engine, 650 NHP
- Propulsion: 1 × screw
- Speed: 12 knots (22 km/h)
- Capacity: passengers, 1913: 12 × 1st class; 140 × 2nd class; 1,274 × 3rd class; passengers, 1922: 144 × cabin class; 1,400 × 3rd class; passengers, 1924: 74 × second class; 1,116 × 3rd class; passengers, 1936: 12, in one class; cargo, 1930: 125,250 cubic feet (3,547 m^{3}) refrigerated; cargo, 1936: 98,450 cubic feet (2,788 m^{3}) refrigerated; cargo, 1937: 406,378 cubic feet (11,507 m^{3}) baled cargo
- Sensors & processing systems: by 1933: wireless direction finding
- Armament: 1941: 1 × BL 4-inch Mk IX naval gun; 4 × Lewis guns; 1943: 1 × 4-inch gun; 8 × machine guns; 2 × larger anti-aircraft guns

SS Audacious was a cargo steamship. She was built in 1913 as the cargo liner Belvedere for the Austro-Hungarian shipping line Unione Austriaca, to take emigrants from Trieste to the Americas. In 1919 Unione Austriaca became Cosulich Line. In 1924 she was converted into a refrigerated cargo ship. In 1933 Cosulich Line became part of Italian Line. In 1935 Belvedere she was chartered as a troopship, taking troops to Italian East Africa. In 1936, most of her passenger accommodation was removed. In 1940 Belvedere was interned in Philadelphia. In 1941 members of her crew disabled her engine, and a US court convicted five of them of sabotage. The US seized Belvedere, had her repaired, renamed her Audacious, and registered her in Panama. United States Lines, and then the United States Navigation Company, managed her for the US government. She sailed in North Atlantic convoys from 1941 until 1944, carrying cargo and occasionally carrying passengers or troops. In 1944 she was a troopship in the Normandy landings at Omaha Beach, and then was scuttled as a breakwater for a Gooseberry Harbor.

== Building and registration ==
Cantiere Navale Triestino in Monfalcone, near Trieste in what was then Austria-Hungary, built the ship. She was launched on 4 April 1913 as Belvedere, named after the 18th-century Belvedere royal palaces in Vienna. She was completed on 22 August. Her lengths were 437.7 ft (133.42 m) overall, and 412.0 ft (125.6 m) registered. Her beam was 51.7 ft (15.8 m), her depth was 26.3 ft (8.0 m), and her draft was 28 ft 9 in (8.76 m). As built, she had berths for 1,426 passengers: 12 in first class, 140 in second class, and 1,274 in third class; and her tonnages were 7,166 GRT and 4,360 NRT. Her first and second class accommodation was in her superstructure amidships. Her third class accommodation was on the upper tween deck in her holds fore and aft.

She had a single screw, driven by a three-cylinder triple-expansion engine that was built by the North Eastern Marine Engineering Co of Newcastle upon Tyne, England. It was rated at 650 NHP, and gave her a speed of 12 knots (22 km/h). She had four single-ended boilers, with a total of 12 corrugated furnaces; and as built, they were coal-fired.

Unione Austriaca registered Belvedere at Trieste. Unusually, Lloyd's Register has no code letters for her when she was registered in Austria-Hungary. From new, she was equipped with wireless telegraphy. By 1914 her call sign was OKB, and her wireless was operated and controlled by the Austro-Hungarian Imperial Inspectorate of the radiotelegraph service, based in Trieste.

== Cosulich Line ==
Belvedere was designed for the route from Trieste to Buenos Aires. However, her maiden voyage, which began on 30 August 1913, was to New York. Over the next year, her ports of call on this route included Patras, Palermo, and Algiers. On 27 March 1914, she arrived in New York carrying seven Egyptian mummies destined for the Panama–Pacific International Exposition, 40 Greek veterans of the First Balkan War, and the brides of 30 of those veterans. Belvedere remained on this route until 20 June 1914. After the First World War began in August 1914, she was laid up at Šibenik on the Austrian Littoral.

On 4 March 1918, Belvedere became an accommodation ship for workers at the Austro-Hungarian Navy dockyard in Pula, and in November 1918, Italian forces captured her there. Belvedere was requisitioned as a troopship, and on 10 April 1919, she left Genoa to carry troops to New York. She flew "the inter-allied flag" from her taffrail as her ensign, and the Italian ensign from her masthead. She called at Marseille, where she embarked the entirety of the American Expeditionary Forces' 13th Railroad Engineers, comprising eight casual officers and 42 civilians. The 13th was a unit organised by Samuel Morse Felton Jr. to operate railroads in France. The unit was commanded by a Colonel CL Whitney, from Montana, and recruited from the staff of 24 US railroads. It operated mainly in Champagne, supporting the French 4th Army. On 28 April, Belvedere reached New York, where she disembarked her railroad men, and was to load a cargo of food for Italy for her return voyage.

=== Italian registration ===
In November 1918, Italy occupied Trieste; and under the Treaty of Rapallo of November 1920, Trieste became part of Italy. On 5 May 1919, Unione Austriaca renamed itself Cosulich Società Triestina di Navigazione. Belvedere's registration passed to Italy, while remaining in Trieste.

On 13 August 1919, Belvedere left Trieste on a voyage to New York. Labor disputes at all of her ports of call delayed her passage. She left Naples on 27 August 1919, and reached New York on 16 September. Among her passengers was the Sistine Chapel Choir, including 18 boy sopranos. The boys were all minors not accompanied by their parents or guardians, so a board of special inquiry of the Bureau of Immigration held a hearing on Ellis Island to examine them and admit them to the US with the minimum of delay. Her route at this time still included Patras.

On a westbound crossing from Trieste to New York in January 1920, Belvedere's route included a call in the Azores, and her New York terminal was in South Brooklyn. After another westbound crossing, she reached Bush Terminal in Brooklyn on 6 July 1920. Public health officials allowed her first and second class passengers straight through US immigration, but sent her 1,517 third class passengers to Hoffman Island for five days' quarantine, as they came from parts of Europe stricken by typhus.

=== Two refits ===
From May 1921, the Emergency Quota Act restricted migration to the US from Europe, and especially from southern and eastern Europe. Cosulich line planned to transfer Belvedere to its route between Trieste and South America, so from 11 May 1922, her accommodation was modified to 144 in cabin class and 1,400 in third class. On 18 September that year, she made her final voyage to New York, before being transferred to the route between Trieste and Buenos Aires. She called at Naples on 20 September 1922, Almería in Spain on 23 September, and reached New York on 9 October. She was due to leave New York on 17 October, to return to Naples. By July 1923, her tonnages had been revised to 7,305 GRT and 4,448 NRT. By July 1924, her code letters were NGHC.

In March 1924, the Monfalcone shipyard began refitting her again. Her furnaces were converted from coal fuel to oil. Her holds were equipped with refrigeration, to carry frozen meat from Argentina. The Liverpool Refrigeration Co, Ltd of England supplied the refrigeration system. It used brine as the coolant, and both granulated cork and "silicate cotton" (mineral wool) as insulation materials. Her passenger accommodation was revised again, to 74 second class and 1,116 third class. Her refit had been completed by August 1924. By 1928, her tonnages had been revised again, to 7,420 GRT and 4,575 NRT. By 1930, her refrigerated cargo capacity was 125,250 cubic feet (3,547 m^{3}).

== Italia Flotte Riuniti ==
On 2 January 1932, Cosulich Società Triestina di Navigazione merged with Lloyd Sabaudo and Navigazione Generale Italiana to form Italia Flotte Riuniti. By July 1933, Belvedere was equipped with wireless direction finding. On 9 November 1933, as new ships entered service, she was transferred to routes serving the Adriatic Sea, Tyrrhenian Sea, and Buenos Aires. By July 1934, her call sign was IBIE, and this had superseded her code letters.

On 18 January 1935, Belvedere left Buenos Aires for the last time, with the intention of being converted into a cargo-only ship for services between Italy and North America. However, on 17 February that year, when she was in Civitavecchia, the Ministry of the Navy chartered her for trooping between Italy and Italian East Africa. She went to Naples, where on 27 February she left for Eritrea. On 5 March she arrived in Massawa, where she remained as a stationary cold store. On 8 May that year, she left Trieste on a naval transport voyage. On 3 October, Italy attacked Ethiopia, starting the Second Italo-Ethiopian War.

On 5 May 1936, the war ended. By July 1936, Belvedere's refrigerated cargo capacity had been revised to 98,450 cubic feet (2,788 m^{3}). On 17 August 1936 she returned to Trieste at the end of her charter, having completed 17 voyages for the Navy. She then went to Monfalcone, to be refitted for her return to merchant service. Her accommodation was reduced to a total of only 12 passenger berths. On 20 September that year, she resumed merchant service to South America.

== Italia Line ==
Italia Flotte Riuniti became "Italia" Società Anonima di Navigazione, and on 4 January 1937, Belvedere's registration was transferred to Genoa. In May 1937 she arrived at Cantieri Riuniti dell'Adriatico in Monfalcone, to be converted into a cargo-only ship, as had been planned two years earlier. Her total cargo capacity was now 406,378 cubic feet (11,507 m^{3}). Her tonnages were revised again, to 6,889 GRT and 4,316 NRT. On 1 June that year she entered service on a route between the Adriatic and the US, serving the Tyrrhenian Sea, Boston, New York, Philadelphia, and the Gulf of Mexico.

By 7 June 1940, Belvedere was in Philadelphia. On the same day, the Italian government ordered all of its merchant ships to take refuge in neutral ports. Belvedere's Master, Captain Romano Tomicich, prepared to lay her up in port indefinitely. Three days later, on 10 June, Italy joined the Second World War by invading France, so Belvedere was interned in Philadelphia. On the opposite bank of the Delaware River, three other Italian ships remained at Gloucester in the Port of Camden, New Jersey. They were Antonietta, Mar Glauco, and Santarosa. (Note: The ship is Santarosa, written as one word. She was built in Scotland in 1924 as Baron Wemyss. The New York Times incorrectly calls her Santa Rosa. This is misleading, as at that time there were other ships that were named Santa Rosa, written as two words.)

=== Machinery disabled ===
In 1941, relations between Italy and the US deteriorated. On 6 March, it emerged that the US government had asked the Italian government to restrict the movements of its consular staff in the US. And on 29 March, the US government "took into custody" of all 28 Italian merchant ships in US ports, including Belvedere. United States Navy men from Philadelphia Naval Shipyard, and US Coastguard men, boarded Belvedere and the three ships at Gloucester. On all four ships, they found that, only hours earlier, "the main shafts and parts of the engines of the four freighters had been burned through with acetylene torches", and that on two of the ships at Gloucester, holes had been punched in their boilers. A detachment of US Marines took the crews of the four ships to the US Immigration and Naturalization Service station in Gloucester. Other Marines and US Coast Guard men formed armed guards aboard the four ships. Days later, a US Coast Guard report detailed the damage to Belvedere's machinery. Her condensers, crossheads, and low-pressure cylinder had been smashed, and there was other minor damage.

When questioned, Captain Tomicich said that the crew of his ship, and of the three ships at Gloucester, sabotaged their engines "on orders from the proper authority", and that "We did the best we could to put the engines and ships completely out of commission. We did not want our own Italian ships carrying bombs to England to bomb our people." However, he added, "We were distinctly told that our government would not tolerate sinking or setting fire to our ships in American waters; that under no circumstances were we to do anything that would in any way harm the American people. That is why all the damage was done on the inside of the ships."

=== Prosecution and convictions ===
The crews of all four ships were investigated for sabotage, and some of them were charged under the Espionage Act of 1917. If convicted, they faced penalties of either up to 20 years in jail, a fine of up to $10,000, or both. However, Belvedere was in Pennsylvania, whereas the three ships at Gloucester were in New Jersey, placing them under two different jurisdictions. On 7 April, 37 members of the crews from the three ships at Gloucester were indicted to appear in court at Woodbury, New Jersey, on 10 April, and were bailed for $5,000 each. That same day, Gerald A. Gleeson, Federal Attorney for the United States District Court for the Eastern District of Pennsylvania, announced that 16 members of Belvedere's 37 crew would appear the next day in Philadelphia before a Federal grand jury, charged with sabotage.

The Order Sons of Italy in America were reported as funding two defense counsels for the 16 defendants. However, at the hearing in Philadelphia, the defendants appeared without counsel, and Captain Tomicich gave the impression that he had expected the Italian Embassy in Washington to provide counsel. The grand jury indicted Tomicich, Chief Engineer Vittorio Battistella, and 12 members of Belvedere's crew. Bail was set at $7,500 for Tomicich and Battistella, and $2,500 each for each of the other crewmen, but meanwhile all of the defendants were held at the courthouse, to be transferred to Moyamensing Prison. Their trial was scheduled for June. US Marshals also seized Belvedere's chronometer, sextant, and typewriter, pending the outcome of the case. After the hearing, Tomicich said "You tell the consul and the embassy I did what they told me to do. Now they are abandoning me and my men. They had better not let me and my men stay around for two months in jail."

In June 1941, on trial in Philadelphia, Tomicich stated that he gave Battistella a written order to disable Belvedere's engine. The judge, Herbert Funk Goodrich, advised the jury that the word "sabotage" did not apply in this case, as Tomicich had ordered it, and it was done by members of the crew. On 27 June, the jury convicted Tomicich, Battistella, and three other officers from Belvedere, and acquitted seven members of her crew.

== Audacious ==
On 6 June 1941, the Ship Requisition Act became part of US law, empowering the US Coast Guard to seize foreign merchant ships that were laid up in US ports. On 11 July, President Franklin D. Roosevelt ordered the seizure under the Espionage Act of 1917 of one German and 15 Italian ships, including Belvedere. She was renamed Audacious, owned by the United States Maritime Commission, and from 27 October she was managed by United States Lines. She was registered under the Panamanian flag of convenience, and her call sign was HPYA.

By 3 November 1941, she was armed with one BL 4-inch Mk IX naval gun and four .30 caliber Lewis guns, and she had degaussing equipment for her hull to counter magnetic mines. Her 4-inch (100 mm) gun was mounted on a raised platform on her after deckhouse. By 14 November she carried 100 rounds of ammunition for this gun.

Audacious' status changed during the war. In February 1942, the War Shipping Administration (WSA) was established, and Audacious became part of its fleet. From 2 November 1942, the United States Navigation Co managed Audacious. By mid-1943, she was more heavily armed. Photographs from 6 July 1943 onward show her with five pairs of raised platforms for anti-aircraft guns, as well as her 4-inch gun aft. Three pairs on her superstructure, and one pair just forward of her 4-inch gun aft, are small platforms that seem to be for machine guns. One pair of larger platforms on her fo'c's'le may have been for larger anti-aircraft guns.

From November 1941 until March 1944, Audacious took part in the Battle of the Atlantic, carrying supplies from North America to the UK. On her eastbound voyages, she sailed in HX convoys, which were destined for Liverpool in England. Until the fall of 1942, HX convoys assembled at Halifax, Nova Scotia. Thereafter, they assembled at New York. On different voyages, Audacious carried general cargo; mail; steel; and military stores. In August and September 1942, in Convoy HX 205, she carried 167 passengers as well as general cargo. In September 1943, in Convoy HX 257, she carried troops as well as general cargo. Her final transatlantic crossing was eastbound with Convoy HX 280, in February and March 1944. She carried general cargo, plus acid.

On at least three occasions, Audacious suffered what may have been mechanical problems. On March 1942, she left Halifax with Convoy HX 179, but turned back. On 15 March she tried again with the next departure, Convoy HX 180, but fell behind as a straggler. In December 1942, she straggled from Convoy HX 219. On 2 December 1943, she left New York with Convoy HX 269, but turned back. She left again on 10 December with Convoy HX 270.

=== Omaha beach ===
Convoy HX 280 reached Liverpool on 9 March 1944. After Audacious discharged her cargo, large holes were made through the bulkheads between her holds, and scuttling charges were planted in her double bottom. The 4-inch gun on her poop was removed, and replaced with anti-aircraft guns: probably one Bofors 40 mm L/60 gun and four Oerlikon 20 mm cannon.

She then steamed to Scotland to await D-Day. Early in June 1944, she embarked about 2,000 United States Army troops. She sailed under naval escort, and just after midnight on 6 June 1944 she arrived off Omaha Beach, where her troops transferred to landing craft to go ashore. She was then towed to her assigned position to form part of the Gooseberry Harbor breakwater. Her civilian crew transferred to landing craft, and then the charges in her double bottom were detonated to scuttle her. Her US Navy Armed Guards remained aboard to man her guns until 18 June. From 19 to 22 June, there was a storm that wrecked the Gooseberry Harbor. After the war, Audacious was salvaged and scrapped.

== Evidence to Congress ==
In August 1986, maritime historian and author Charles Dana Gibson used Audacious as an example in written testimony to the US House of Representatives Subcommittee on Merchant Marine, in a hearing about the veteran status and recognition of merchant seafarers in the war. Dana noted that those who served on the Normandy blockships had been granted veteran status as members of The Blockship Group – Mulberry Operation, Normandy, with the application submitted specifically for "the Panamanian freighter Audacious," but those serving in equally dangerous roles at sea had not. He noted that Audacious' crew had comprised a mixture of nationalities, and had never been a part of any military command, although blockship crews were under virtual "house arrest" by the Army to ensure secrecy, and that the blockship operation was a joint Army, Navy and WSA effort. He further noted the service aboard the blockships was no more dangerous than merchant seafarers aboard ships then operating for periods within the harbor created by the blockships. After repeated refusals in Congress, a court ordered veteran status to most World War II merchant seafarers on 19 January 1988.

== Bibliography ==
- Haws, Duncan (2001). Italia 1881–2001. Merchant Fleets. Vol. 40. Pembroke. ISBN 0-946378-43-6.
- Lloyd's Register of Shipping. Vol. II.–Steamers. London: Lloyd's Register of Shipping. 1914 – via Internet Archive.
- Lloyd's Register of Shipping. Vol. II.–Steamers. London: Lloyd's Register of Shipping. 1919 – via Internet Archive.
- Lloyd's Register of Shipping. Vol. II.–Steamers and Motorships. London: Lloyd's Register of Shipping. 1923 – via Internet Archive.
- Lloyd's Register of Shipping. Vol. II.–Steamers and Motorships. London: Lloyd's Register of Shipping. 1924 – via Internet Archive.
- Lloyd's Register of Shipping. Vol. I.–Sailing Vessels. London: Lloyd's Register of Shipping. 1928 – via Internet Archive.
- Lloyd's Register of Shipping. Vol. II.–Steamers and Motorships. London: Lloyd's Register of Shipping. 1928 – via Internet Archive.
- Lloyd's Register of Shipping (PDF). Vol. I.–Steamers and Motorships Under 300 Tons. London: Lloyd's Register of Shipping. 1930 – via Southampton City Council.
- Lloyd's Register of Shipping (PDF). Vol. II.–Steamers and Motorships of 300 Tons Gross and Over. London: Lloyd's Register of Shipping. 1933 – via Southampton City Council.
- Lloyd's Register of Shipping (PDF). Vol. I.–Steamers and Motorships of 300 Tons Gross and Over. London: Lloyd's Register of Shipping. 1934 – via Southampton City Council.
- Lloyd's Register of Shipping (PDF). Vol. I.–Steamers and Motorships Under 300 Tons. London: Lloyd's Register of Shipping. 1936 – via Southampton City Council.
- Lloyd's Register of Shipping (PDF). Vol. I.–Steamers and Motorships of 300 Tons Gross and Over. London: Lloyd's Register of Shipping. 1938 – via Southampton City Council.
- Lloyd's Register of Shipping (PDF). Vol. I.–Steamers and Motorships of 300 Tons Gross and Over. London: Lloyd's Register of Shipping. 1941 – via Southampton City Council.
- The Marconi Press Agency Ltd (1914). The Year Book of Wireless Telegraphy and Telephony. London: The Marconi Press Agency Ltd.
