= SS Oceania (1907) =

Austro-Hungarian cargo liner and hospital ship

- SS Oceania in 1907

History

Austria-Hungary
- Name: Oceania
- Owner: Unione Austriaca
- Operator: 1915: Austro-Hungarian Navy; 1918: Austro-Hungarian Navy
- Port of registry: Trieste
- Route: 1907: Trieste – South America; 1908: Trieste – New York
- Builder: A Stephen & Sons, Linthouse
- Yard number: 423
- Launched: 10 September 1907
- Completed: November 1907
- Maiden voyage: 26 November 1907, to South America
- Refit: 1915, as hospital ship
- Identification: code letters HPJN; by 1914: call sign OKO
- Fate: mined & torpedoed, October 1918

General characteristics
- Type: cargo liner
- Tonnage: 5,497 GRT, 3,488 NRT
- Length: 391.1 ft (119.2 m)
- Beam: 50.0 ft (15.2 m)
- Depth: 23.2 ft (7.1 m)
- Decks: 2
- Installed power: 2 × triple-expansion engines, 584 NHP
- Propulsion: 2 × screws
- Speed: 14 knots (26 km/h)
- Notes: sister ship: Argentina

SS Oceania was a steam cargo liner. She was built in Scotland in 1907 for the Austro-Hungarian shipping line Unione Austriaca, to take emigrants from Trieste to South America. From 1908 she worked a route between Trieste and New York. In the First World War, she was a hospital ship from 1915 until 1916, and again from May 1918. In October 1918, she struck a mine off the coast of Albania, and was beached. Ten days later, an Austro-Hungarian torpedo boat torpedoed her, to prevent Italian forces from capturing her.

== Argentina and Oceania ==
In 1907, two shipyards on the River Clyde built a pair of sister ships for Unione Austriaca. Russell and Company of Port Glasgow launched yard number 582 on 26 August as Argentina, and completed her that October. Alexander Stephen and Sons of Linthouse in Glasgow launched yard number 423 on 10 September as Oceania, and completed her that November.

Oceania's registered length was 391.1 ft (119.2 m), her beam was 50.0 ft (15.2 m), and her depth was 23.2 ft (7.1 m). Her tonnages were 5,497 GRT and 3,488 NRT. Her passenger capacity may have been similar to Argentina's: 45 berths in first class, 75 in second class, and 1,230 in third class. She had twin screws, driven by a pair of three-cylinder triple-expansion engines. The combined power of her twin engines was rated at 584 NHP, and gave her a speed of 14 knots (26 km/h). Unione Austriaca registered her at Trieste. Her code letters were HPJN. By 1910 she was equipped with wireless telegraphy. By 1914 her call sign was OKO, and her wireless was operated and controlled by the Austro-Hungarian Imperial Inspectorate of the radiotelegraph service, based in Trieste.

On 26 November 1907, Oceania began her maiden voyage, which was to South America. Most of her passenger capacity was third class, in which she carried emigrants from Austria-Hungary and Italy. From 26 September 1908, she was transferred to a route from Trieste to New York, via Patras and Palermo. In January 1910, she also called at Naples. In June 1911, her ports of call included the Azores and Naples. In 1913, her outward voyages from Trieste were typically via Patras, Palermo, and Algiers. Her return voyages were via Algiers, Naples, and Patras; and sometimes included a call at Venice.

== Hospital ship ==
In October 1915, the Austro-Hungarian Navy requisitioned Oceania to be a hospital ship. She was returned to her owners in March 1916. In May 1918 she was requisitioned again, for the same purpose.

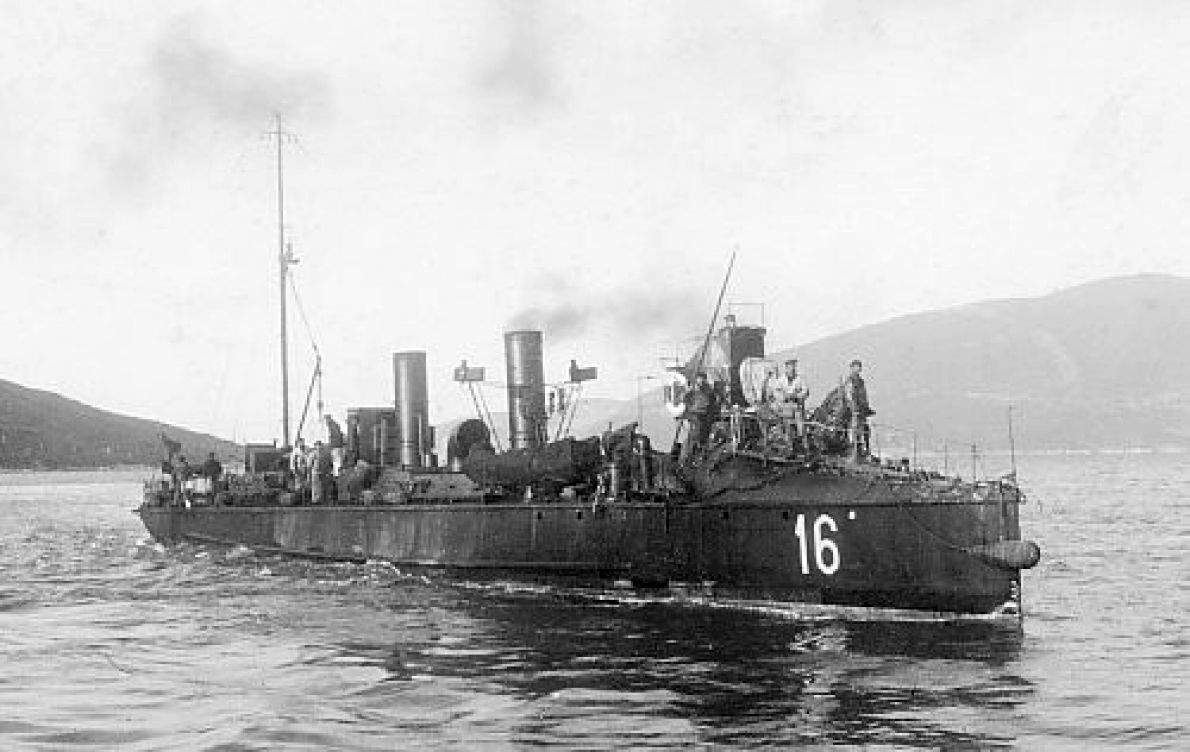
The Cobra-class torpedo boat Tb 16

On 4 October 1918, Oceania struck a mine at position 41°35′N 19°26′E, off the Cape of Rodon in Albania. She was beached to prevent her sinking. On 14 October, the Cobra-class torpedo boat Tb 16 torpedoed her, sinking her to prevent Italian forces from capturing her.

Oceania's sister ship Argentina was also requisitioned as a hospital ship in 1918. She survived both world wars, and was scrapped in 1960.

== Bibliography ==
- Haws, Duncan (2001). Italia 1881–2001. Merchant Fleets. Vol. 40. Pembroke. ISBN 0-946378-43-6.
- Lloyd's Register of British and Foreign Shipping. Vol. I.–Steamers. London: Lloyd's Register of Shipping. 1908 – via Internet Archive.
- Lloyd's Register of British and Foreign Shipping. Vol. I.–Steamers. London: Lloyd's Register of Shipping. 1910 – via Internet Archive.
- The Marconi Press Agency Ltd (1914). The Year Book of Wireless Telegraphy and Telephony. London: The Marconi Press Agency Ltd.
