= Cosulich Line =

Italian shipping company

- House flag (1903-1919)
- Industry: Shipping
- Founded: 1857; 169 years ago
- Headquarters: Trieste, Italy

The Cosulich Line, formally the Cosulich Società Triestina di Navigazione, is a shipping line that was based in Trieste, Italy. The company was founded in 1889 by Antonio F. Cosulich's son as a family business. In 1903 as Unione Austriaca di Navigazione, more commonly called the Austro-American or Austro-Americana Line, when Trieste was under the rule of Austria-Hungary. After the first World War, the company became an Italian-based shipping company. In 1932 the company was forced to merge with the Lloyd Sabaudo and the Navigazione Generale Italiana, to form the Italian Line.

== History ==
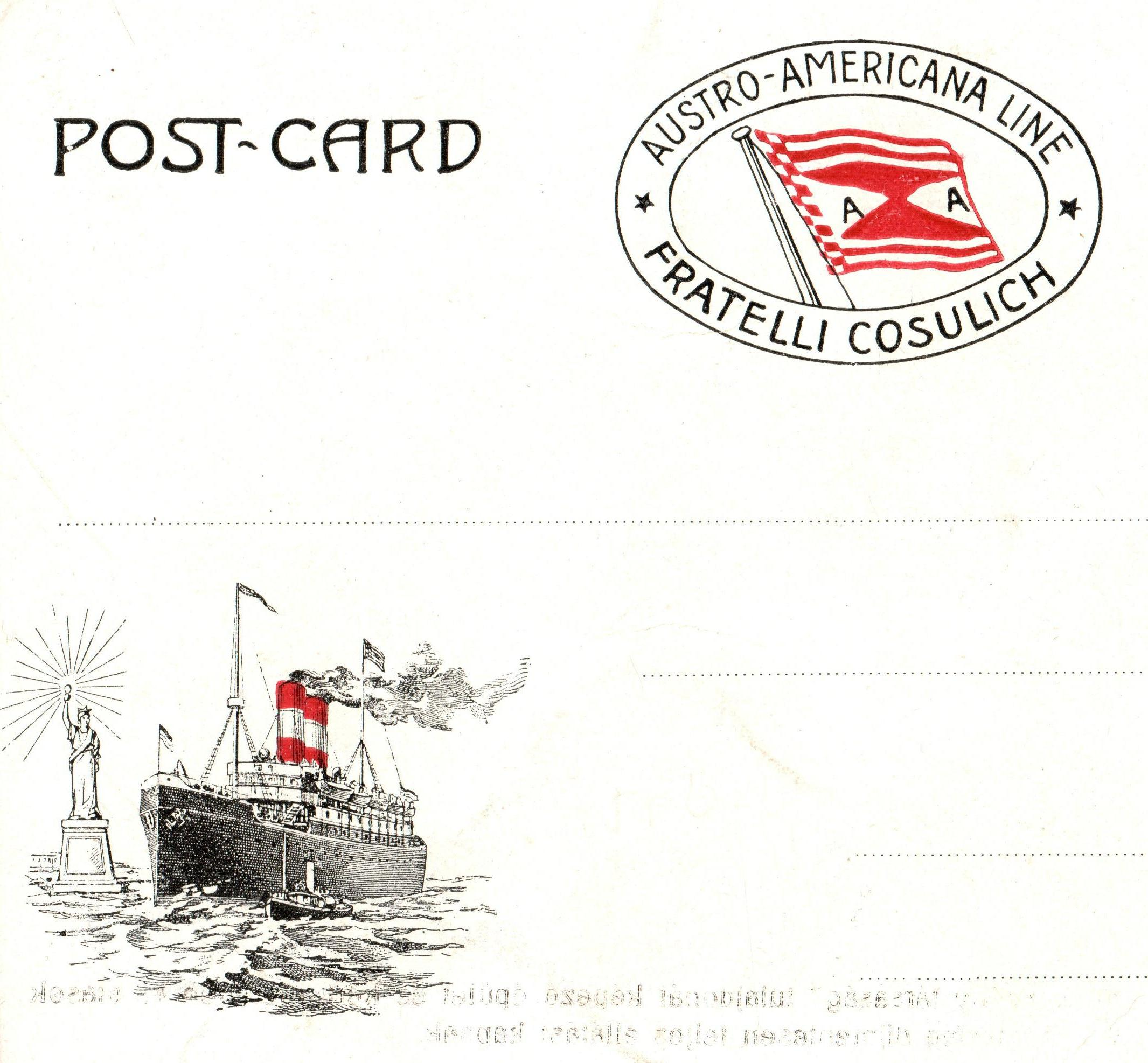
Austro-American Line, Fratelli Cosulich, 1909

In 1857 Captain Antonio F. Cosulich launched the family business with the 500-tonne ship Fides built-in Cherso, a Kavner Island of Istria. The company's first four ships were purchased from England in the year it was founded. The first voyages took place every six weeks and went from Trieste to Mobile, Brunswick, Charleston, Wilmington, and Newport News, as well as to other ports on the East Coast as required. Since business was good, three more used ships were bought in 1897 and four in 1898. In 1901 was a turning point for the shipping business As a result of the global economic crisis of 1901–1902, some of the ships had to be sold again. In 1902, William Burell left the company and sold his shares to the Cosulich brothers. The share capital was increased, 14 ships were taken over from the Cosulich shipping company and in 1903 the company was renamed Unione Austriaca di Navigazione già Austro-Americana e Fratelli Cosulich Società Anonima or the Austro-American line.

Unione Austriaca di Navigazione was founded in Trieste in 1903 by Fratelli Cosulich. The Cosulich family originated from the island of Lussino (today Lošinj, Croatia) now operating as the Austro-American Line, ships of the company carried passengers from Trieste to Messina, Naples, Palermo, and New York. Service to South American ports and New Orleans began in 1907 (though the New Orleans service was quickly discontinued).

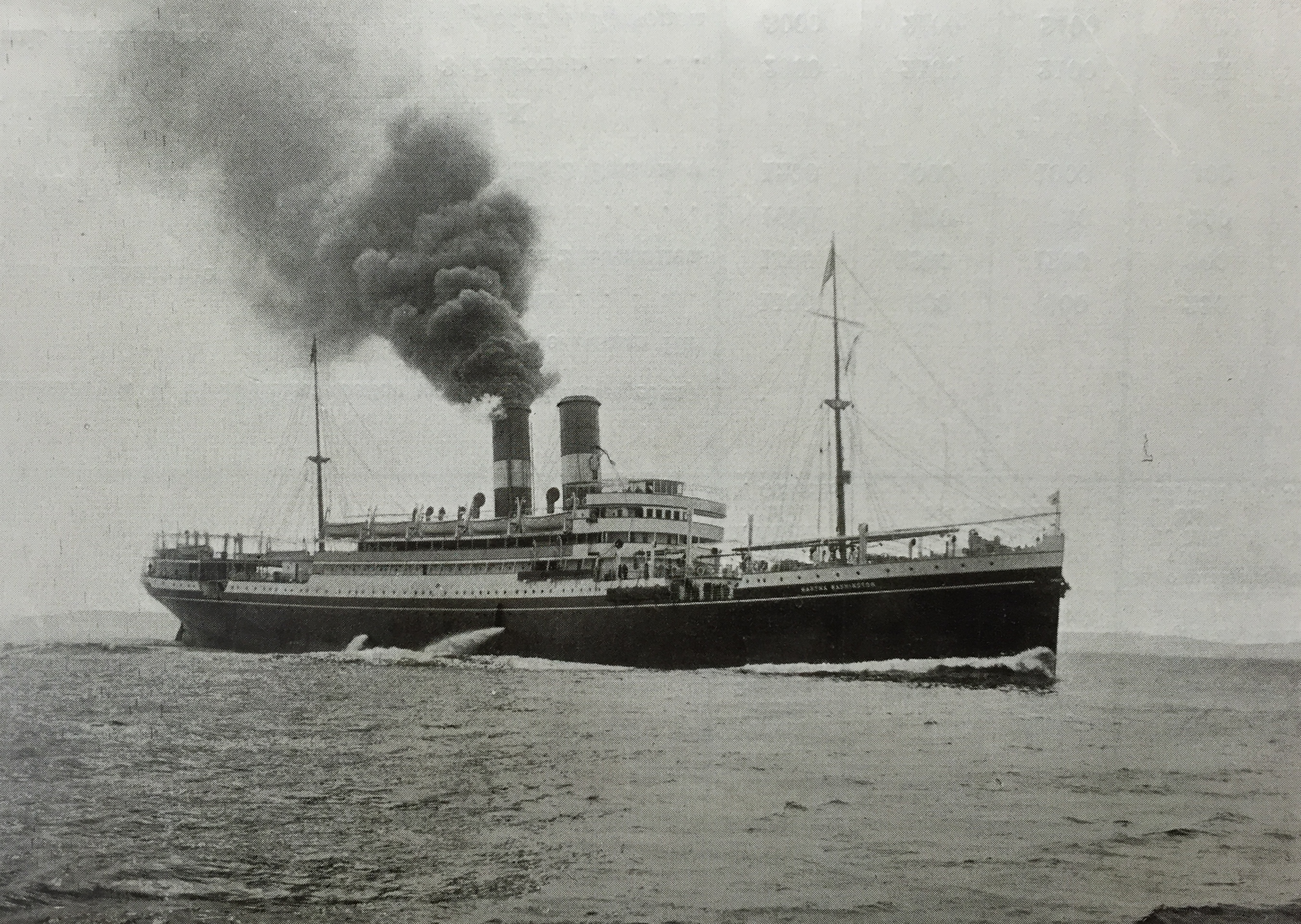
SS Martha Washington, one of the ships of the Austro-American line

In 1904 the company had 19 ships. In the same year, passengers were also transported for the first time, since many people emigrated to the United States at that time, and a profitable business area was therefore offered. Here you could also divert customers from the two North German competitors Norddeutscher Lloyd and Hamburg America Line. With the entry into the passenger business, however, one also reacted to the agreement with the English Cunard line with the Hungarian government, which planned to take over the Hungarian emigrant traffic. Cosulich made arrangements with the Canadian Pacific Steamship Company for service from Trieste to Canada which proved to be uneconomical and was canceled after six voyages. At the outbreak of World War I, passenger services ceased.

House flag (1919–1932)

After the Armistice, Trieste came under the rule of Italy. Reorganized as an Italian company under the name Cosulich Società Triestina di Navigazione, or Cosulich STN, the line, now sailing under the Cosulich Line name, resumed service from Mediterranean ports to New York and South America. In 1932, the Cosulich Line and fellow Italian passenger companies Lloyd Sabaudo and Navigazione Generale Italiana were merged into the state-owned Italia Flotte Riunite (English: United Fleets Italy), or ITALIA, though Cosulich was able to maintain its management from Trieste. When ITALIA was liquidated in 1937, Cosulich was absorbed into the replacement Italia Società Anonima di Navigazione, or Italian Line.

The company exists today as the Fratelli Cosulich Group, still a shipowner, a ship operator, a ship fuel provider, a shipping agency, a freight logistics company and other related businesses, still based in Trieste.

== List of ships ==
Ship	Built	In service for Cosulich	Type	GRT	Notes	Image
San Giusto	1890	1919–1924	Ocean liner	8,430	Former HAPAG liner Fürst Bismarck. used as torpedo boat depot for the Austro-Hungarian navy and seized by the Italian navy in 1918. Sold to Cosulich after World War I. Scrapped in 1924.	
Sofia Hohenburg	1905	1905–1920		5,491		
Laura	1907	1907–1917	Cargo Liner	6,125		
Argentina	1907	1907–1926	Cargo Liner	5,526	Served as a hospital ship from 1914–1918. Scrapped in 1960.	
Oceania	1907	1907–1918	Cargo Liner	5,497	Used by the Austro-Hungarian Navy as a hospital ship from 1915–1916 and again in 1918. Struck a mine off the coast of Albania in 1918 and beached to prevent sinking. Sunk by a Cobra-class torpedo boat in 1918 to prevent capture by the Italian navy.	
Martha Washington	1908	1908–1914, 1922–1932	Ocean liner	8,312	Interned by the US Navy in 1914, returned in 1922. Renamed Tel Aviv in 1932. Scrapped in 1934	
Kaiser Franz Joseph I	1912	1912–1929	Ocean liner	12,567	Commissioned as an Italian troopship in 1918 and renamed Generale A. Diaz. Sold back to Couslich in 1919 and renamed Presidente Wilson. Sold to Lloyd Triestino and renamed Gange in 1929. Sold again in 1936 to Adriatica di Navigazione and renamed Marco Polo. Repurposed as a troopship again during World War II and scuttled by German forces in 1944. Raised and scrapped in 1949.	
Kaiserin Elizabeth	1912 (Laid down)	Never entered service	Ocean liner	14,700	Construction paused in 1914 due to World War I. Scrapped after the war in 1920.	
Belvedere	1913	1913–1932	Cargo Liner	7,166	Converted to a refrigerated cargo ship in 1924. Chartered as a troopship in 1935 during the Second Italo-Ethiopian War. Interned by the US in 1940 and seized in 1941, being renamed Audacious. Managed by the US navigation company throughout the war. She was present during the Normandy landings as a troopship. Scuttled as breakwater in 1944.	
Saturnia	1925	1925–1932	Ocean liner	23,940	Served as a troopship during the Second Italo-Ethiopian War. In 1942, the ship engaged in repatriation of Italian citizens from East Africa under the Red Cross. The ship was lended to the US War Shipping Administration following the Italian armistice in 1943. The ship was returned to Italy in 1946 and scrapped in 1965.	
Vulcania	1928	1928–1932	Ocean liner	23,970	Requisitioned by the Italian government in 1941. Undertook three voyages for the Red Cross for repatriation of Italian citizens. She was commandeered by the German Navy in 1943. Became a troopship for the US Navy in 1945. Chartered to American Export Lines for six voyages in 1946. Returned to Italy later the same year. Sold to Grimaldi SIOSA Line in 1965 and renamed Caribia. Hit a rock off Cannes in 1972. Sunk in 1973 while on route for scrapping.	
Neptunia	1932	1932–1937	Ocean liner	19,475		
Oceania	1933	1933–1937	Ocean liner	19,507		
