= SMS Kígyó =

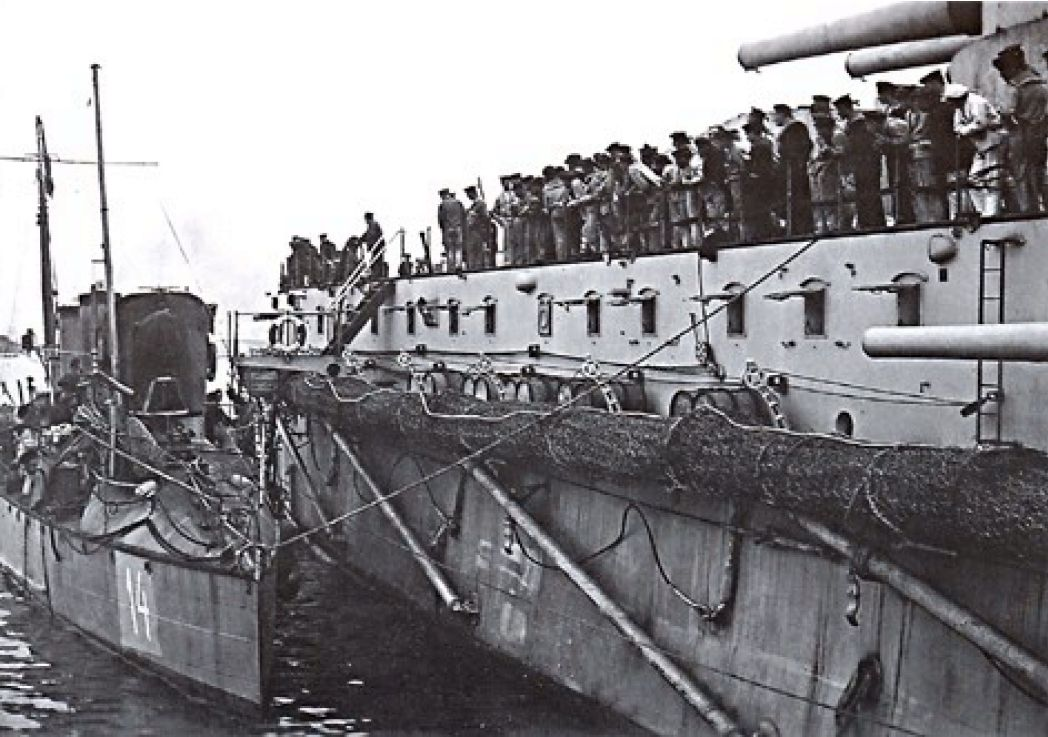
- SMS Kígyó (left), before 1920

History

Austria-Hungary
- Name: SMS Kígyó
- Namesake: Hungarian for snake
- Builder: Yarrow Shipbuilders, England
- Laid down: 1898
- Launched: 11 April 1899
- Completed: 31 January 1900
- Renamed: Torpedoboot 14, 1910
- Fate: Sold for scrapping, 1920

General characteristics
- Class & type: Cobra-class torpedo boat
- Displacement: 132 long tons (134 t)
- Length: 46.5 m (152 ft 7 in)
- Beam: 4.6 m (15 ft 1 in)
- Draft: 1.4 m (4 ft 7 in)
- Propulsion: Reciprocating engines, 1,800 hp (1,342 kW)
- Speed: 24 knots (44 km/h; 28 mph)
- Complement: 2 officers, 20 men
- Armament: 2 × 47 mm (1.9 in) L/33 guns; 3 × 45 cm (17.7 in) torpedo tubes

SMS Kígyó was a torpedo boat of the Austro-Hungarian Navy (KuK). In 1910, she was renamed Torpedoboot 14.

== Design and construction ==
The Cobra-class torpedo boats were ordered in Great Britain for the Austro-Hungarian Navy, their design being based on the SMS Viper.

The ship was built at the Yarrow shipyard in London. The torpedo boat was laid down in 1898, was launched on 11 April 1899, and commissioned on 31 January 1900.

== Technical data ==
The ship was a small coastal torpedo boat. The length of the design was 46.6 meters (152 ft 11 in) (45.9 m, 150 ft 7 in between the perpendiculars), the width was 4.6 m (15 ft 1 in) and the draft was 2.3 m (7 ft 7 in). Her standard displacement was 115 tons, and the full displacement was 135 tons. The ship was powered by a triple-expansion steam engine with a design power of 1,800 horsepower (1,300 kW) (maximum 2,000 hp, 1,500 kW), steam supplied by two Yarrow boilers. The single-screw propulsion system allowed to reach a speed of 24 knots (44 km/h; 28 mph). She also held a stock of 30 tons of coal.

She was equipped with three 450 mm single torpedo tubes. The artillery armament consisted of two single 47 mm L/33 Hotchkiss on-board cannons.

== Operational history ==
In 1910, on the basis of the ordinance on the normalization of names, Kígyó was renamed Torpedoboot 14. In 1913, she underwent a major renovation, and in 1914 she was adapted to act as a seaplane tender, one torpedo tube being removed to be replaced by a catapult. Due to the collapse of the Habsburg monarchy on 1 November 1918, the KuK flag was hoisted on the vessel for the last time. As a result of the Treaty of Trianon, the ship was awarded to Great Britain. The vessel was scrapped in 1920.
