= Kaiser Franz Joseph I (ship) =

The ship Kaiser Franz Joseph may refer to one of the following:

- SMS Kaiser Franz Joseph I, Seized by the Allied powers on 9 November, Sank during a gale off Kumbor on 17 October 1919.
- SS Kaiser Franz Joseph I, Scuttled by the Germans during World War II, raised and scrapped in 1949.
