= List of ships named Oceania =

A number of ships have been named Oceania, including:

- SS Oceania (1907), an Austro-Hungarian ocean liner, and World War 1 hospital ship
- SS Oceania (1909), an Italian ocean liner, built for La Veloce
- MV Oceania (1932), an Italian Line passenger liner, sunk on 18 September 1941
- MV Oceania (1950), an Italian Line passenger-cargo ship, broken up in 1977
- RV Oceania, a tall ship and research vessel owned by the Polish Academy of Sciences, launched in 1985

== See also ==
- Oceania Cruises, a U.S.-based luxury cruise line
- Oceania (disambiguation)
