= Neptunia =

Neptunia may refer to:

- Neptunia (plant), a genus of plants within the subfamily Mimoseae
- Neptunia (gastropod), an emendation of Neptunea, a genus of sea snails
- Neptunia (Darkwing Duck), a cartoon character in the television series Darkwing Duck
- Neptunia, Uruguay, a resort location in Canelones Department, Uruguay
- MS Neptunia, an Italian liner launched in 1931
- MV Neptunia, an Italian tanker launched in 1945
- Hyperdimension Neptunia, a video game series
- Neptunia, a Roman colony at Taranto, Italy
