= SMS Natter =

At least three ships in the Prussian Navy (later German Imperial Navy) or Austro-Hungarian Navy were named SMS Natter:

- SMS Natter (1860) - a Prussian Jäger-class gunboat launched in 1860
- SMS Natter (1880) - a German Wespe-class armored gunboat launched in 1880
- SMS Natter (1896) - an Austro-Hungarian torpedo boat launched in 1896
