= SMS Boa =

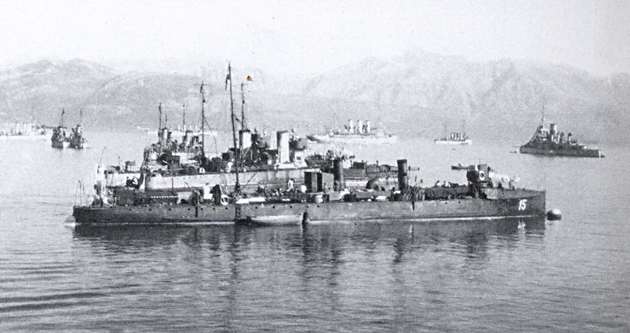
- SMS Boa (foreground), between 1910 and 1920

History
- Name: SMS Boa
- Builder: Yarrow Shipbuilders, England
- Launched: 20 August 1898
- Completed: 24 September 1898
- Renamed: Torpedoboot 15, 1910
- Fate: Sold for scrapping, 1920

General characteristics
- Class & type: Cobra-class torpedo boat
- Displacement: 132 long tons (134 t)
- Length: 46.5 m (152 ft 7 in)
- Beam: 4.6 m (15 ft 1 in)
- Draft: 1.4 m (4 ft 7 in)
- Propulsion: Reciprocating engines, 1,800 hp (1,342 kW)
- Speed: 24 knots (44 km/h; 28 mph)
- Complement: 2 officers, 20 men
- Armament: 2 × 47 mm (1.9 in) L/33 guns; 3 × 45 cm (17.7 in) torpedo tubes

SMS Boa was a torpedo boat of the Austro-Hungarian Navy. Built as a unit of the Cobra class, she was typical of the seagoing torpedo boats acquired by Austria-Hungary between 1896 and 1914. In 1910 she was renamed Torpedoboot 15.

== Development ==
Boa and her sister ships, Python, Kígyó (Snake) and Cobra, were the result of competitive tests between two torpedo boats built in 1895–96. Natter was built by the firm of F. Schichau at Elbing, while Viper was built by Yarrow on the Thames at Millbank. Admiralty (Marinesektion) officials were better satisfied with the performance of Viper, and four slightly larger examples were ordered from Yarrow.

== Design ==
A steel-hulled vessel of 132 tons displacement, Boa measured 152 feet (46 m) six inches (152 mm) in length with a beam of 15 feet (4.6 m) and a draft of four feet six inches. Her reciprocating engines of 1,800 horsepower (1,300 kW) gave a speed of 26 knots (48 km/h). Armament consisted of two 47 mm (1.9 in) quick-firing guns and three 17.7-inch (450 mm) torpedo tubes.

== Service history ==
Launched on the Thames on 20 August 1898, Boa was completed on 24 September of that year. She and her sister ships formed a division of seagoing torpedo boats capable of challenging Italian forces in the event of war.

In 1910 a new nomenclature was introduced for all Austro-Hungarian torpedo boats. Existing names were discarded and replaced with numbers in the series Torpedoboot 1 to Torpedoboot 49. Boa was renamed Torpedoboot 15, abbreviated Tb 15.

During the First World War, Tb 15 was employed as a convoy escort and minesweeper. Allocated to Britain as a war reparation in 1920, she was immediately sold and scrapped in Italy.
