= MS Neptunia =

Italian ocean liner

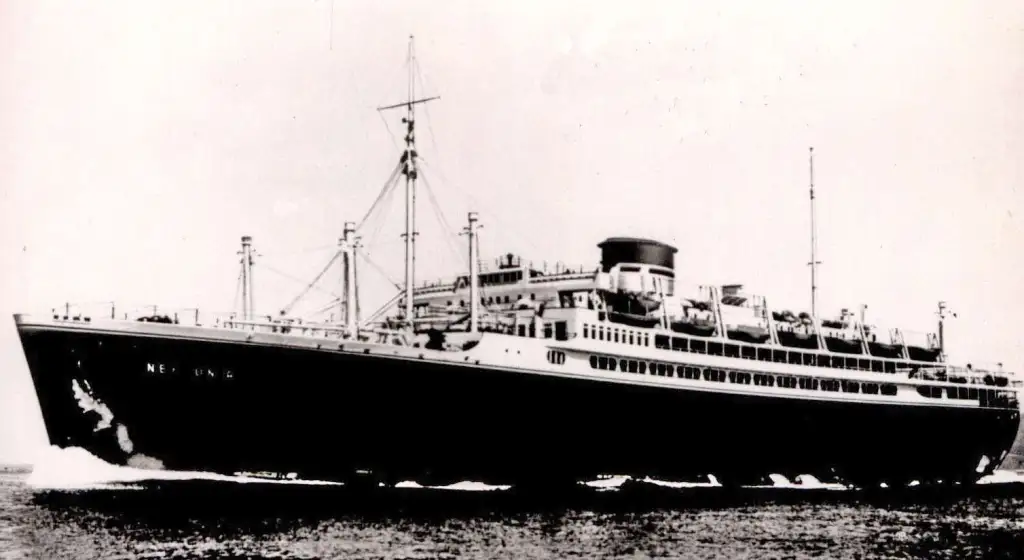
- Neptunia

History

Italy
- Name: Neptunia
- Operator: Cosulich Line (1932–1937); Italian Line (1937–1940); Regia Marina (1940–1941)
- Builder: Cantiere Navale Triestino, Monfalcone
- Laid down: 16 May 1931
- Launched: 27 December 1931
- Maiden voyage: 5 October 1932
- Fate: Torpedoed and sunk on 18 September 1941

General characteristics
- Type: Ocean liner
- Tonnage: 19,475 GRT
- Length: 179.7 m (589 ft 7 in)
- Beam: 23.4 m (76 ft 9 in)
- Draft: 8.4 m (27 ft 7 in)
- Propulsion: 4 CRA Sulzer two cycle engines: 2 x 8 cyl. 8ST68 engines (4,250 hp), and 2 x 9 cyl. 9ST68 engines (4,750 hp), quadruple shaft, 4 screws
- Speed: 21.9 knots (40.6 km/h; 25.2 mph) (max)
- Capacity: 1,537 passengers
- Crew: 272

The MS Neptunia was an Italian ocean liner built by Cantiere Navale Triestino, Trieste for the Cosulich Line. She was launched on 27 December 1931 and on 5 October 1932, she left Trieste on her maiden voyage to Buenos Aires. During 1935 the ship began operating on the Bombay to Shanghai route. During 1937 the Cosulich Line was amalgamated into the Italian Line.

In 1940, the ship was decommissioned for passenger service and was acquired by the Italian Navy as a troopship for the war effort. At 2:00am on 19 August 1941, the Neptunia sailed from Naples in convoy with the Marco Polo, Esperia, and her sister ship, Oceania and naval escort ships bound for Tripoli. Whilst on the approaches to Tripoli, at about 10:20am on 20 August the Esperia was torpedoed three times by the British submarine HMS Unique. The ship sank very quickly, whilst the other ships increased their speed to try and reach safety as quickly as possible. Despite the speed with which the Esperia sank, over 1,100 people were rescued. The convoy reached Tripoli, entering the port at 12:30pm. On 18 September 1941 the Neptunia was sunk by the submarine HMS Upholder.
