= SS Lightburne =

20th c. American tanker

Coordinates: 41°08′57″N 71°32′54″W

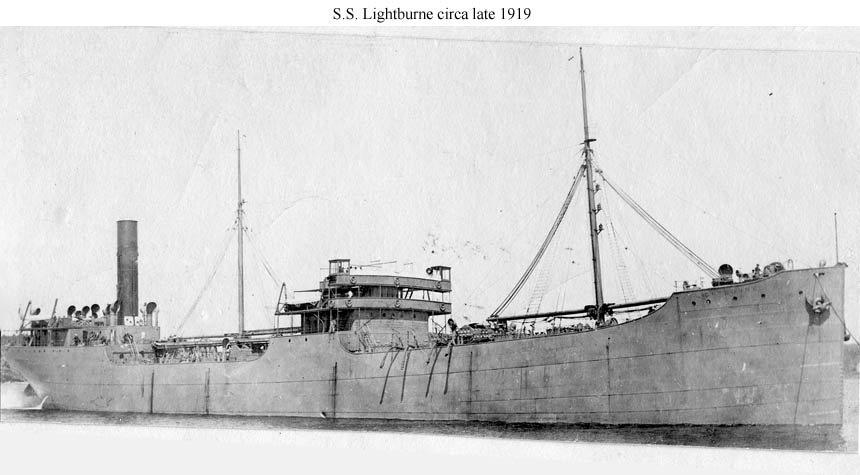

History

United States
- Name: Lightburne
- Namesake: R. W. Lightburne, Jr.
- Owner: USSB (1919–1920); The Texas Company (1920–1939)
- Builder: Texas Steamship Co., Bath
- Cost: US$1,848,214.00
- Yard number: 12
- Laid down: 27 April 1918
- Launched: 19 July 1919
- Sponsored by: Mrs. George B. Drake
- Completed: 30 August 1919
- Home port: Bath (1919–1920); Port Arthur (1920–1927); Wilmington (1928–1939)
- Identification: US Official Number 218753; Call sign LSKV (1918–1933); Call sign KIVF (1934–1939)
- Fate: Wrecked, 10 February 1939

General characteristics
- Type: Tanker
- Tonnage: 6,429 GRT; 3,979 NRT; 9,385 DWT
- Length: 416 ft 8 in (127.00 m)
- Beam: 56 ft 1 in (17.09 m)
- Draft: 25 ft 7 in (7.80 m) (mean)
- Depth: 31 ft 1 in (9.47 m)
- Installed power: 556 Nhp, 3,000 ihp
- Propulsion: H.G. Trout Co. 3-cylinder triple expansion
- Speed: 11 knots (13 mph; 20 km/h)

Lightburne was a steam tanker built in 1918–1919 by Texas Steamship Company of Bath for The Texas Company, with intention of transporting oil and petroleum products between Mexican and Gulf ports and the Northeast of the United States. The ship was named after R. W. Lightburne, Jr., a Kansas City-based steamship agent who rendered valuable assistance to the United States Shipping Board during the war.

== Design and construction ==
In early 1916, Texas Steamship Co., a subsidiary of The Texas Company, acquired property on Kennebec River in Bath and developed a shipyard to build vessels for the parent company. Among the ships built, there were four tankers of approximately 9,500 deadweight constructed in 1917-1919 to expand the company's oil carrying business. Lightburne was laid down on 27 April 1918 and launched on 19 July 1919 (yard number 12), with Mrs. George B. Drake of New York City, wife of the general manager of Texas Steamship Co., being the sponsor. The ship was built on the Isherwood principle of longitudinal framing providing extra strength to the body of the vessel, had two main decks and a shelter deck and had electric lights installed along them. The tanker had two cargo pump rooms located amidships, and sixteen main and sixteen wing or summer tanks constructed throughout the vessel with a total capacity to carry 76,564 barrels of liquid cargo. The vessel was launched almost 90% complete with the machinery already in place.

On 3 August 1917, she was requisitioned by the USSB and was delivered and accepted by USSB on 30 August 1919.

As built, the ship was 416 feet 8 inches (127.00 m) long (between perpendiculars) and 56 feet 1 inch (17.09 m) abeam, a depth of 31 feet 1 inch (9.47 m). Lightburne was originally assessed at 6,784 GRT and 5,154 NRT and had deadweight of approximately 9,385. The vessel had a steel hull, and a single 556 nhp triple-expansion steam engine, with cylinders of 26 1/2-inch (67 cm), 54-inch (140 cm) and 74-inch (190 cm) diameter with a 51-inch (130 cm) stroke, that drove a single screw propeller, and moved the ship at up to 11.0 knots (12.7 mph; 20.4 km/h). The steam for the engine was supplied by three Babcock & Wilcox water-tube boilers fitted for oil fuel.

== Operational history ==
Upon delivery Lightburne proceeded to Port Arthur to load her cargo and departed for Philadelphia on 10 September 1919 reaching her destination ten days later. The ship made a few more trips under USSB control before The Texas Co. acquired all eight tankers, they had built at their shipyard in Bath, in December 1919 for approximately US$14,700,000 (Lightburne's price tag was set at US$1,837,500). Following the transfer the ship continued carrying petroleum products between Gulf ports such as Port Arthur, Galveston and Port Eads and ports on U.S. eastern seaboard, such as Norfolk, Providence and Philadelphia throughout her career.

In addition, the tanker occasionally made international trips, for example she delivered a cargo of oil, gasoline and lubricating oil to Antwerp and Amsterdam in October 1925. In December 1927 she again sailed to Amsterdam, and in April 1931 the vessel delivered her cargo to Rio de Janeiro in Brazil.

On February 26, 1925 the tanker while on her way from Norfolk to Galveston, stumbled upon a boat with three men approximately 375 miles north of Miami. The men were swept away to sea by a storm and were drifting helplessly for 14 days without much food or water. All three of them were taken aboard the ship and safely landed in port.

At about 02:30 on September 12, 1926 while rounding the Algiers Point on her way out of New Orleans harbor for Port Arthur, the stern of Lightburne flanked against the piledriver Vulcan sinking the latter in about 35 feet of water. As Vulcan was going down, her wreckage got entangled with the wheel of the tanker requiring her to get assistance from two tugs to free her gear. The ship suffered very little damage in collision and was able to continue sailing to her destination.

In the morning of December 5, 1926 while proceeding up north along Delaware River during a snowstorm, Lightburne collided side on with another tanker, SS Charles M. Everest off Marcus Hook. While Lightburne sustained only slight damage, the other vessel had her bow twisted and forepeak seams open.

From late 1928 the tanker started making occasional trips to California. For example, on December 18, 1928 Lightburne passed through the Panama Canal carrying 8,227 tons of gasoline from Los Angeles to New York. Starting in 1931 the vessel was also actively used on several international routes to deliver oil to South America, Europe and China. Texaco's expansion resulted in more ports being served by the tanker, especially in the southeastern United States. In addition to her trips up north, Lightburne started delivering her cargo to places such as Charleston, Tampa, Savannah and West Indies. For example, in November 1934 she delivered petroleum products to Charleston and Cuba.

=== Sinking ===
Lightburne departed Port Arthur for her last journey on February 2, 1939 carrying approximately 72,000 barrels of gasoline and kerosene bound for Providence. The tanker was under command of captain Alexander Wolman and had a crew of 37. After a largely uneventful journey the ship was nearing her destination in the evening of February 10. The weather was stormy, with wind topping 33 mph (53 km/h) and thick fog prevailing in the area. At about 19:30 the ship suddenly ran aground on the southern shore of Block Island, about a quarter mile off Southeast Lighthouse. The rugged rocks on the beach punctured the bottom of the vessel, flooding her engine room and the No.4 main hold, releasing some of her cargo into the water. The ship sent out a S.O.S. signal at 19:46, which attracted a number of vessels to her rescue, including steamer SS Thomas Tracy and cutters Active, Campbell, Chelan, General Greene and Argo. Thomas Tracy was the first at the scene but could not provide any assistance due to strong winds and surf in the vicinity of the stricken vessel. At 22:06 U.S. Coast Guard cutter Active arrived and was able take off seventeen people off using a surfboat from the local station, while the captain and the rest of the crew decided to remain on board the ship. At 00:37 on February 11, the remaining crew was forced to abandon ship due to her deteriorating condition. Their evacuation by U.S. Coast Guard cutter Campbell took over two hours to complete, and was not finished until shortly after 02:30. Later in the morning on February 11, the automatic flare lifebuoy was washed off the tanker stern down into the water igniting gasoline within 50 yards from the vessel. Fortunately, due to shifting winds mostly blowing away from the shore, Lightburne was never in danger and the fire eventually got extinguished by 12:45. Following the inquiry captain of the ship was censured for his failure to take soundings while navigating in fog, but retained his license and was later put in charge of another Texaco vessel, Harvester.

Due to tanker's position on the rocks it was eventually decided not to pursue salvaging operations because their cost would have exceeded the value of the vessel and her cargo. Over the next few months lighters were employed to unload as much cargo as possible, before the ship was demolished as a danger to navigation and the wreck sank in about 30 ft (9.1 m) of water.
