= Cobra-class torpedo boat =

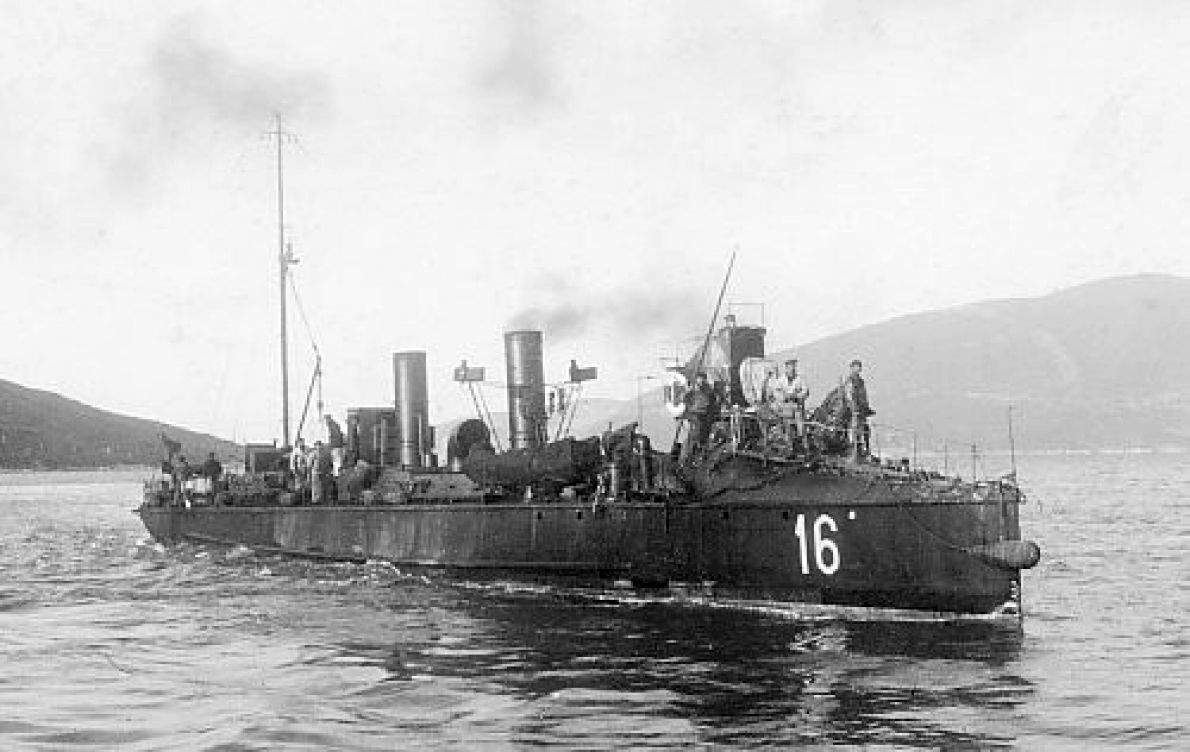
- SM Tb 16 (ex-Cobra) before 1920

Class overview
- Builders: Yarrow, Poplar, London
- Operators: Austro-Hungarian Navy
- Succeeded by: Kaiman class
- In commission: 1898–1918
- Completed: 4
- Scrapped: 4

General characteristics
- Type: Torpedo boat
- Displacement: 135 t (133 long tons) full load
- Length: 45.9 m (150 ft 7 in) wl
- Beam: 4.6 m (15 ft 1 in)
- Draught: 2.3 m (7 ft 7 in)
- Installed power: 1,800 ihp (1,300 kW)
- Propulsion: 2 × Yarrow boilers; 1 × triple-expansion steam engine
- Speed: 24 knots (44 km/h; 28 mph)
- Complement: 21
- Armament: 2× 47 mm (1.9 in) guns; 3 × 45 cm (17.7 in) torpedo tubes

The Cobra class (also known as the Python class) was a class of four torpedo boats built by the British shipbuilder Yarrow for the Austro-Hungarian Navy in the late 1890s. All four ships served through the First World War and were scrapped in 1919.

== Design and construction ==
In 1895, the Austro-Hungarian Navy purchased one torpedo boat each from the British shipbuilder Yarrow and the German shipbuilder Schichau-Werke, two specialist builders of torpedo vessels. The two torpedo boats, which carried identical armament, were evaluated against each other. While there was little to choose between the seaworthiness of the two ships, the German-built ship, Natter, suffered vibration at high speed, while the Yarrow-built torpedo-boat, Viper, did not suffer such vibration and the Yarrow design was chosen for further development, with four more torpedo-boats ordered from Yarrow to a modified design.

The new torpedo boats were 46.6 m (152 ft 11 in) long at the waterline and 45.9 m (150 ft 7 in) between perpendiculars, with a beam of 4.6 m (15 ft 1 in) and a draught of 2.3 m (7 ft 7 in). Two coal-fired Yarrow water-tube boilers fed a single three-cylinder triple expansion steam engine which drove a single propeller shaft. The machinery was rated at 1,800 indicated horsepower (1,300 kW) giving a speed of 24 knots (44 km/h; 28 mph), although 2,000 ihp (1,500 kW) was generated during sea trials, when Python reached a speed of 24.34 knots (45.08 km/h; 28.01 mph).

The ships were armed by two 47-millimetre (1.9 in) L/33 Skoda guns and three 450 mm (17.7 in) torpedo tubes, (except Kigyo which was only fitted with two torpedo tubes), with two forward on the sides of the ship, where they could fire almost dead ahead, and one on the ships' centreline aft. The ships had a crew of 21.

== Service ==
The four ships were laid down at Yarrow's Poplar, London shipyard in 1897–1898 and completed in 1898–1900. In 1910, all Austro-Hungarian torpedo-boats were redesignated, replacing their names by numbers, with the Cobra class becoming Tb 13 – Tb 16.

On the outbreak of the First World War three of the torpedo-boats (Tb 13, Tb 15 and Tb 16) were based at Cattaro as part of the local defence forces, serving as escorts and minesweepers throughout the war, while Tb 14 was used as a salvage vessel for the naval air station at Pola (now Pula in Croatia, later transferring to Šibenik. All four ships survived the war, and were allocated to France and Britain under the Treaty of Saint-Germain-en-Laye in 1919 (with Tb 13, Tb 15 and Tb 16 going to France and Tb 14 going to Britain) and were scrapped in 1920.

== Ships ==
- SMS Cobra – laid down 1897, launched 1898, completed 1899. Renamed Tb 16 in 1910.
- SMS Boa – laid down 1897, launched September 1898, completed 1898. Renamed Tb 15 in 1910.
- SMS Kigyo – laid down 1898, launched 11 April 1899, completed 31 January 1900. Renamed Tb 14 in 1910.
- SMS Python – laid down 1898, launched 11 April 1899, completed 12 October 1899. Renamed Tb 13 in 1910.
