= SMS Viper (1896) =

Austro-Hungarian torpedo boat

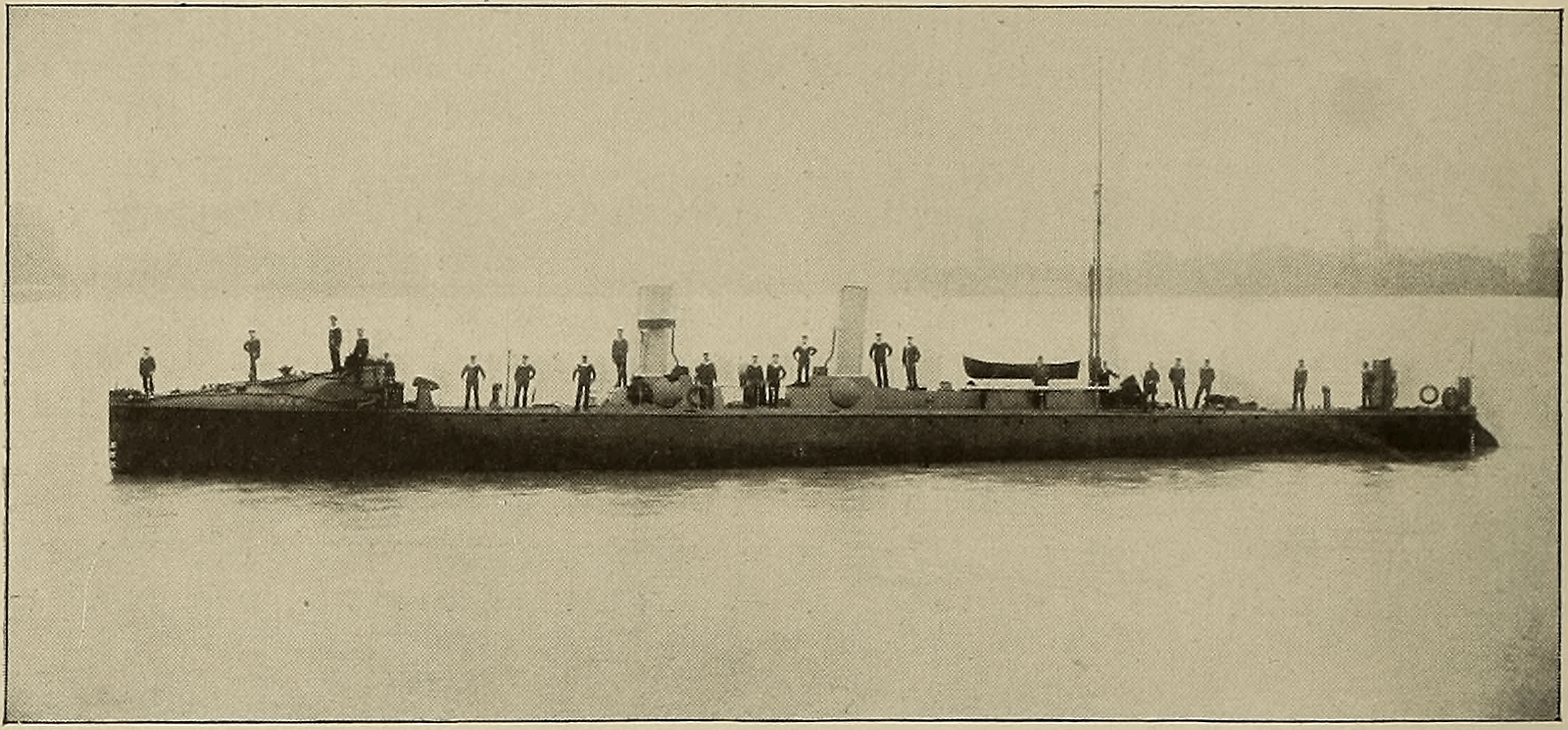

History
- Name: SMS Viper
- Builder: Yarrow Shipbuilders, England
- Laid down: 1895
- Launched: January 1896
- Completed: October 1896
- Renamed: Torpedoboot 17, 1910
- Fate: Sold for scrapping, 1920

General characteristics
- Displacement: 107 long tons (109 t)
- Length: 44.8 m (147 ft 0 in)
- Beam: 4.5 m (14 ft 9 in)
- Draft: 2.4 m (7 ft 10 in)
- Propulsion: Reciprocating engines, 1,800 hp (1,342 kW)
- Speed: 24 knots (44 km/h; 28 mph)
- Complement: 2 officers, 20 men
- Armament: 2 × 47 mm (1.9 in) L/33 guns; 3 × 45 cm (17.7 in) torpedo tubes

SMS Viper (Note: "SMS" stands for "Seiner Majestät Schiff ", or "His Majesty's Ship" in German.) was a torpedo boat of the Austro-Hungarian Navy. Viper was built by the British shipbuilder Yarrow between 1895 and 1896 and formed the basis for the following Cobra-class torpedo boats. She was renamed Torpedoboot 17 in 1910 and served through the First World War as a patrol boat and minesweeper. She was scrapped in 1920.

== Design ==
In 1895, the Austro-Hungarian Navy purchased one prototype torpedo boat each from the British shipbuilder Yarrow and the German shipbuilder Schichau-Werke, two specialist builders of torpedo vessels.

Yarrow's design was 44.96 m (147 ft 6 in) long overall and 44.8 m (147 ft 0 in) between perpendiculars, with a beam of 4.5 m (14 ft 9 in) and a draught of 2.3 m (7 ft 7 in). Displacement was 107 t (105 long tons) normal and 126 t (124 long tons) full load. Two coal-fired Yarrow water-tube boilers fed a single three-cylinder triple expansion steam engine which drove a single propeller shaft. The machinery was rated at 1,800 indicated horsepower (1,300 kW) giving a speed of 24 knots (44 km/h; 28 mph). (Note: 1,900 ihp (1,400 kW) giving a speed of 25 knots (46 km/h; 29 mph) according to Conway's.)

The ships was armed by two 47-millimetre (1.9 in) L/33 Skoda guns and three 450 mm (17.7 in) torpedo tubes, with two tubes forward on the sides of the ship, where they could fire almost dead ahead, and one on the ships' centreline aft. The ship had a crew of 21.

== Construction and service ==
The Yarrow torpedo boat, named Viper, was laid down at Yarrow's Poplar, London shipyard in 1895, and launched in January 1896, earlier than the competing Schichau-built torpedo boat Natter. She reached a speed of 26.5 knots (49.1 km/h; 30.5 mph) during sea trials, and was completed in October 1896. While both torpedo boats had similar stability and seaworthiness, Natter suffered from vibrations at high speed, and the Yarrow design was chosen for further orders, with four ships of the slightly larger Cobra-class torpedo boat ordered from Yarrow.

In 1910, Austria renamed most of its torpedo boats, with Viper becoming Tb 17. On the outbreak of the First World War Tb 17 formed part of the 21st Torpedo boat Group of the 11th Torpedo Craft Division, a local defence force based at Cattaro, and was still based at Cattaro on 20 March 1917, as a member of the 25th Torpedo boat Group of the 15th Torpedo Craft Division. She was employed as an escort and minesweeper during the war, and was allocated to France as a War reparation as part of the Treaty of Saint-Germain-en-Laye in 1919. She was scrapped in 1920.
