= SS Kaiser Franz Joseph I =

Passenger liner ship

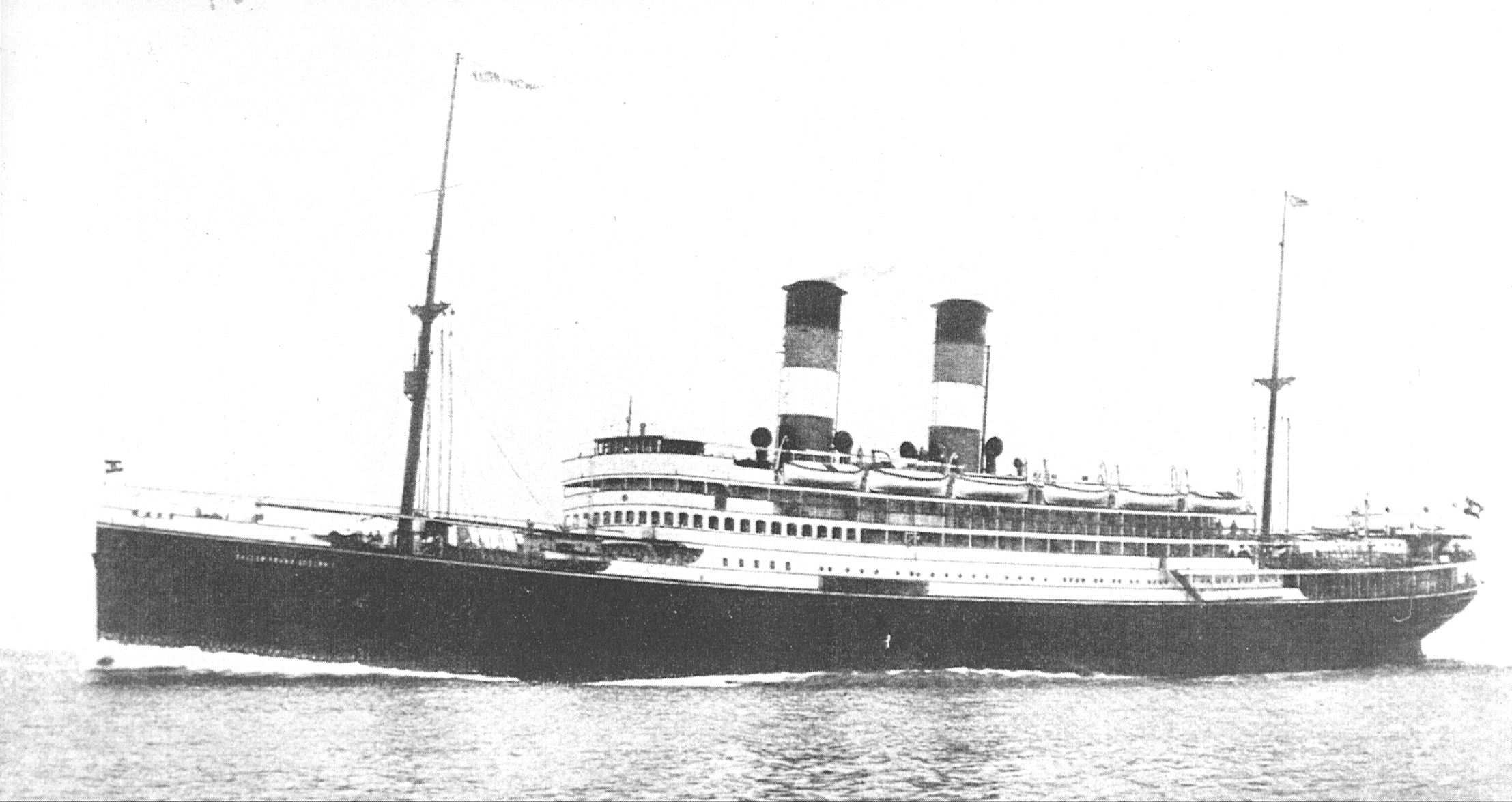

History
- Name: Kaiser Franz Joseph I (1912-1918); Generale A. Diaz (1918-1919); Presidente Wilson (1919–1930); Gange (1930–1936); Marco Polo (1936–1944)
- Operator: Austro-American line (1912-1918); Cosulich Line (1919–1929); Lloyd Triestino (1929-1937); Adriatica di Navigazione (1937-1940); Regia Marina (1918-1919, 1940-1944)
- Builder: Cantiere Navale Triestino
- Launched: 9 September 1911
- Completed: February 1912
- Maiden voyage: 25 May 1912
- Fate: Scuttled, 1944; Raised and scrapped, 1949

General characteristics
- Type: Ocean liner
- Tonnage: 12,567 GRT
- Length: 145.54 m (477 ft 6 in)
- Beam: 18.35 m (60 ft 2 in)
- Draft: 7.9 m (25 ft 11 in)
- Propulsion: triple expansion steam engines, dual shaft, 2 Propeller
- Speed: 19 knots (35 km/h; 22 mph)
- Capacity: 1,905 total passengers

SS Kaiser Franz Joseph I was an Austro-Hungarian passenger liner built by Cantiere Navale Triestino for the Cosulich Line. Launched in February 1912, she was put into service and embarked on her maiden voyage from Trieste to New York City. During World War I, she was laid up in Trieste but was commissioned by the Italian Navy after the war.

Renamed Presidente Wilson under the Cosulich Line, the ship was later sold to another Italian company before the outbreak of World War II. During the war, she was recommissioned by the navy and subsequently laid up in La Spezia in 1943. On 12 May 1944, as the Allies advanced through Italy, the ship was scuttled by the Germans to prevent capture. Her wreck was raised and scrapped in 1949.

== History ==
The keel of the ship was laid down at the Cantiere Navale Triestino shipyard in Monfalcone. She was christened on 9 September 1911 by Archduchess Maria Josepha and Navy Commander Admiral Count Rudolf Montecuccoli and was launched on the same day. The following year, she embarked on her maiden voyage from Trieste to New York City. When World War I broke out, Kaiser Franz Joseph I was laid up in Trieste for the duration of the war. In 1918, following the Armistice of Villa Giusti and the surrender of Austria-Hungary, the ship was commissioned by the Italian Navy as a troopship and renamed Generale A. Diaz.

In 1919, she was sold to the Cosulich Line and renamed Presidente Wilson. On 5 May 1919, she set off on her first post-war voyage from Genoa to New York City, carrying primarily returning U.S. soldiers. On 12 September 1919, she departed Trieste on her third peacetime voyage, carrying 97 passengers in first class, 371 in second class, and 623 in third class. In 1929, she completed her final voyage for the Cosulich Line before being sold to Lloyd Triestino and renamed Gange after the Indian river of the same name. She was later sold to Adriatica di Navigazione and renamed Marco Polo after undergoing modernization.

Following her modernization, she resumed service on routes between Trieste, Venice, Brindisi, and Alexandria, as well as Haifa and Beirut. In 1940, when World War II broke out, the ship was decommissioned from passenger service and repurposed as a troop transport. She was laid up in La Spezia in 1943. On 12 May 1944, as the Allies advanced through Italy, the ship was scuttled by the Germans to prevent capture. The wreck was raised and scrapped in 1949.

== Design ==
Upon her launch, Kaiser Franz Joseph I was the largest ocean liner in Austro-Hungary. She had a passenger capacity of 1,905, accommodating 125 in first class, 550 in second class, and 1,230 in third class. The ship had a gross registered tonnage (GRT) of 12,567, a length of 145.54 m (477 ft 6 in), and a beam of 18.35 m (60 ft 2 in).

She was powered by two four-cylinder triple-expansion steam engines, which drove a dual shaft connected to two screw propellers, giving the ship a speed of approximately 19 knots (35 km/h; 22 mph).

== Gallery ==
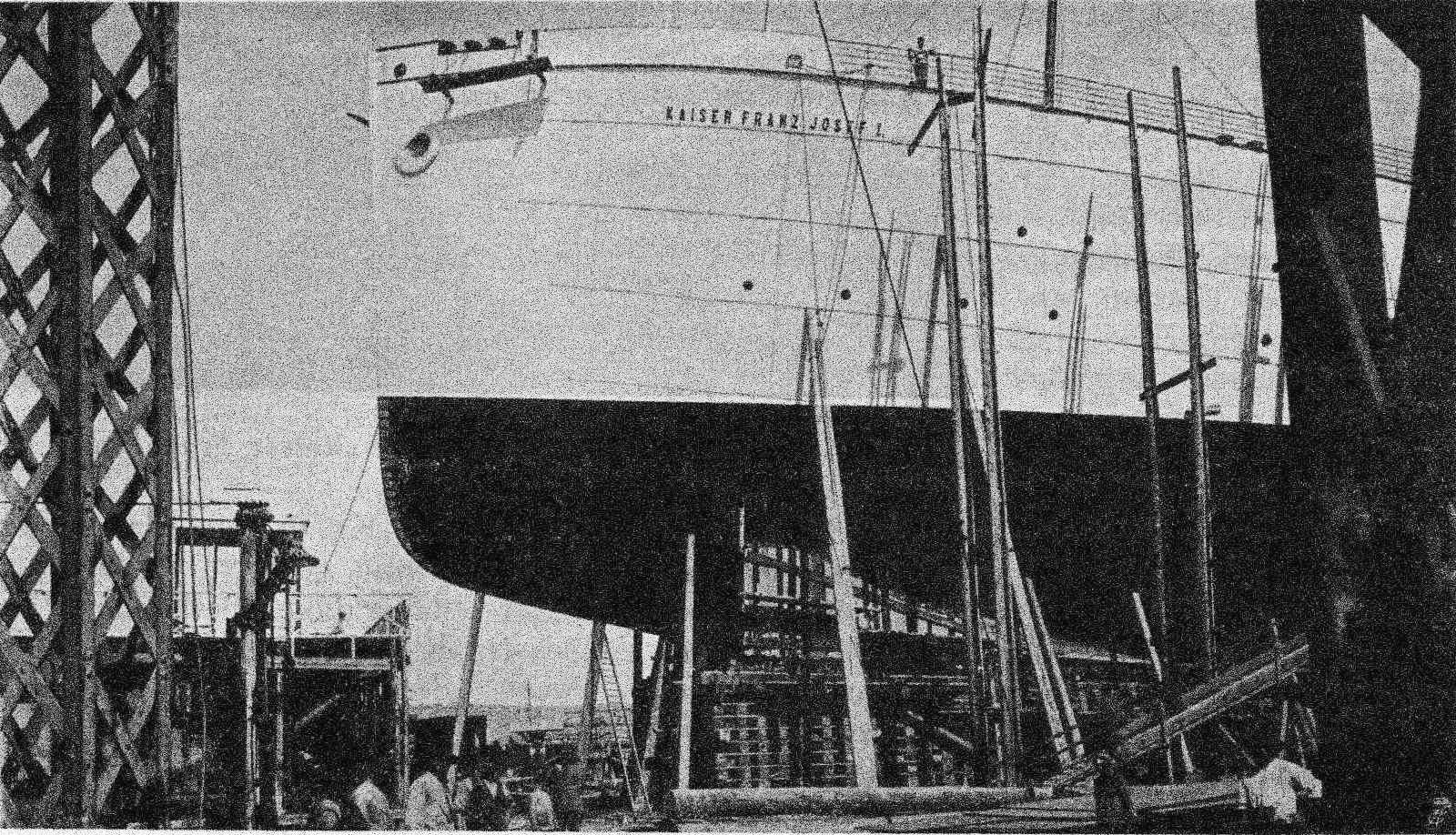
Kaiser Franz Joseph I under construction in Cantiere Navale Triestino Shipyard

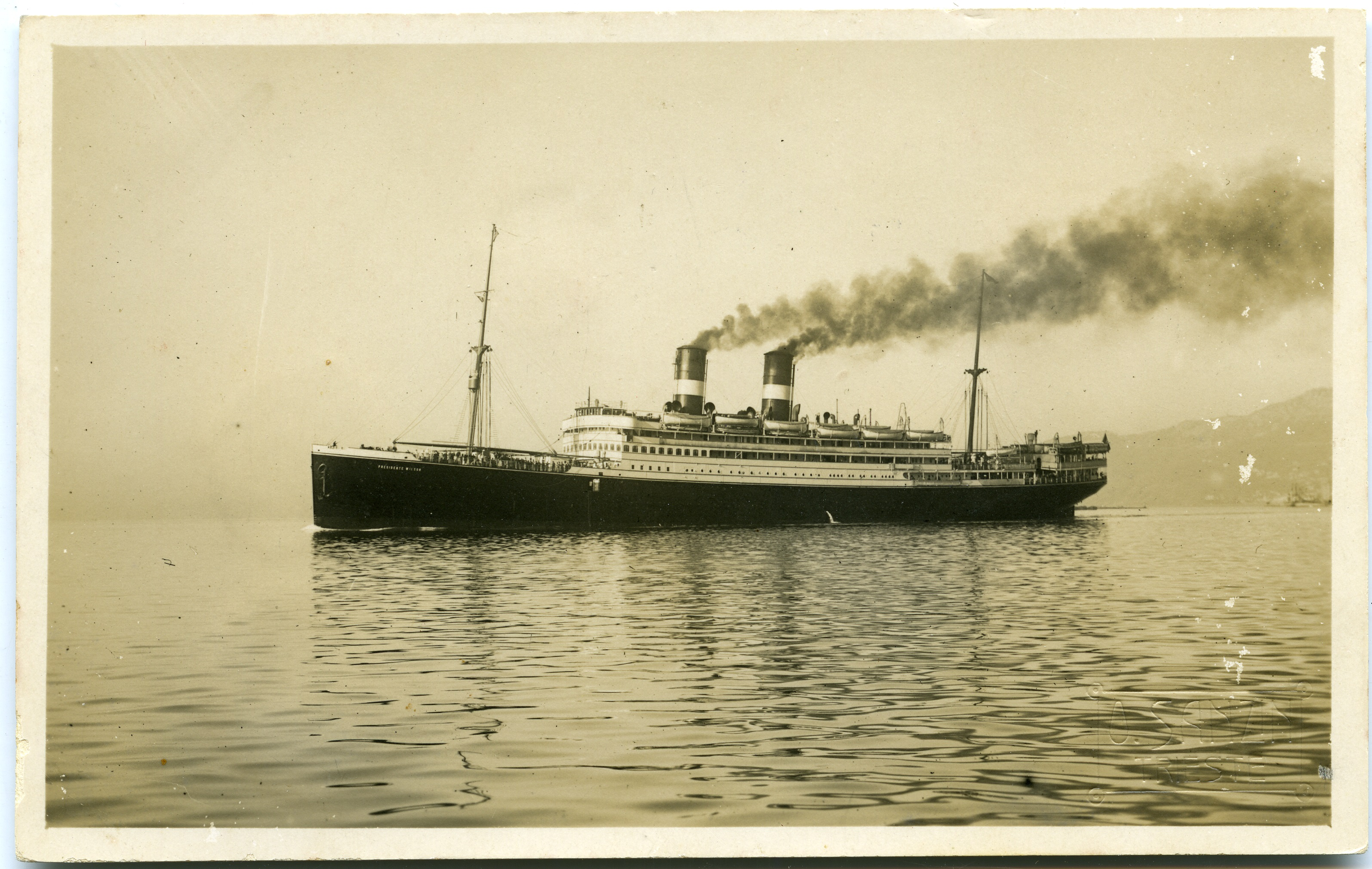
Presidente Wilson

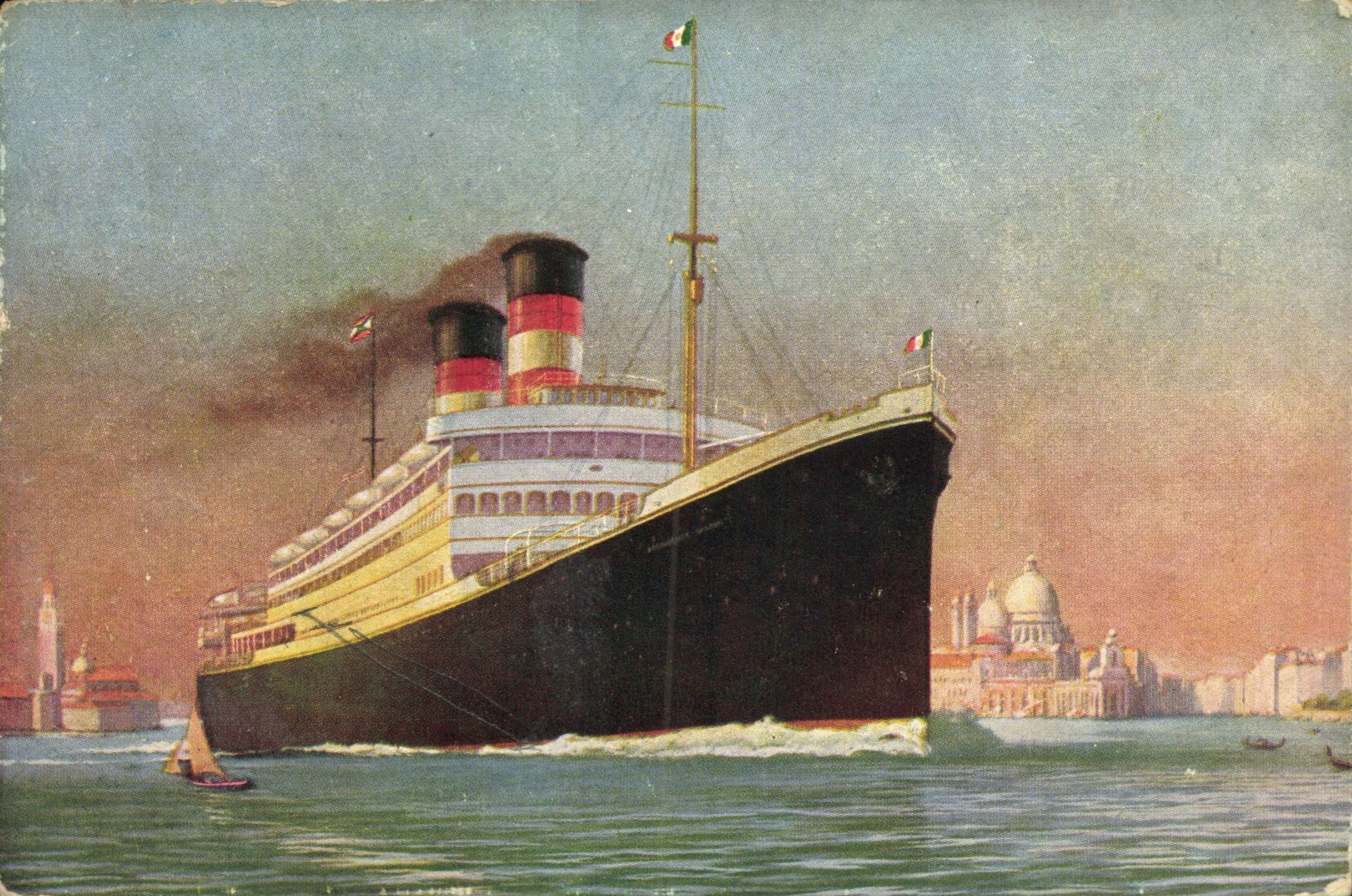
Postcard of Presidente Wilson
