= Port of Trieste =

Commercial port in Italy

Coordinates: 45.6589°N 13.7636°E

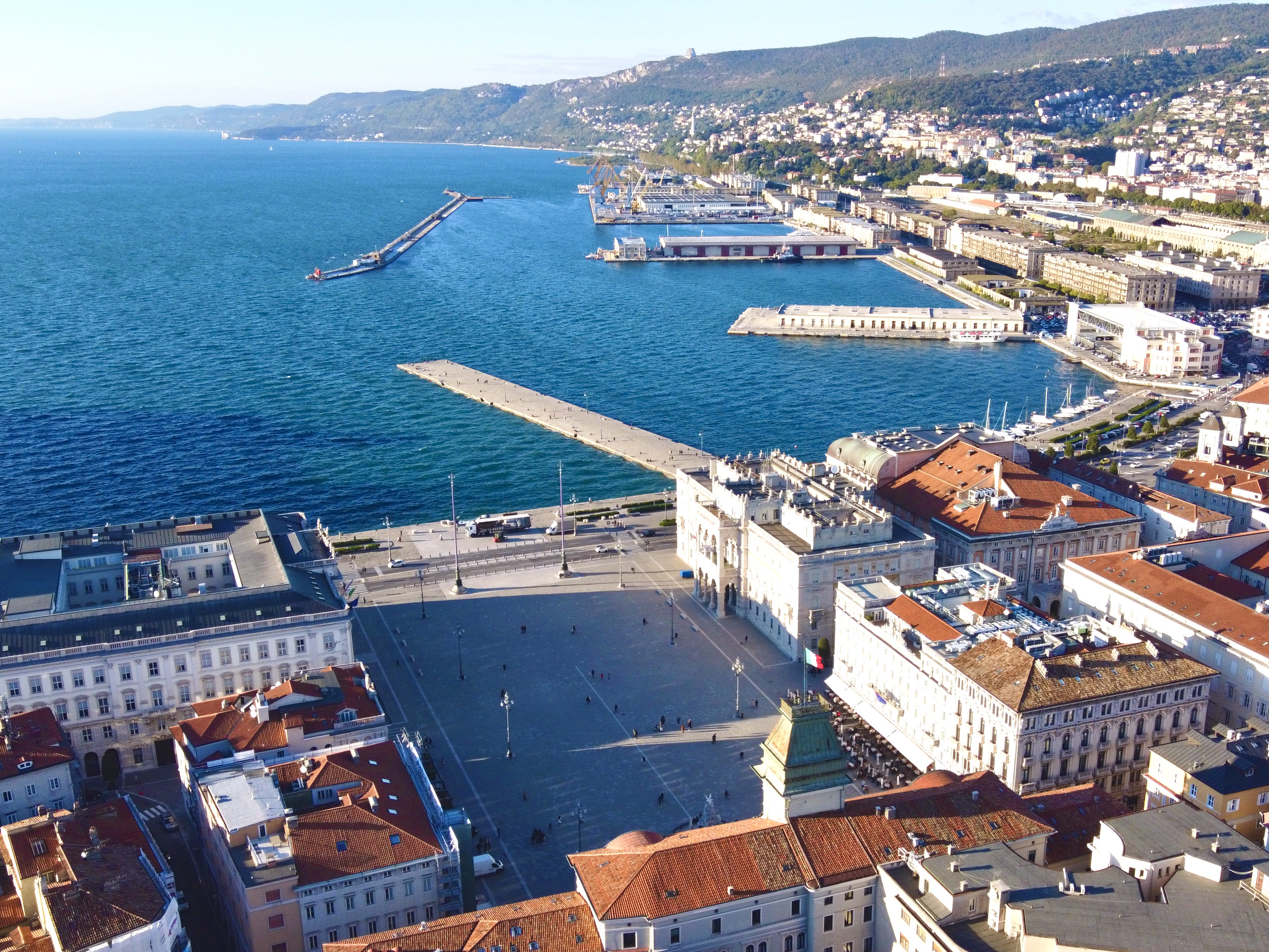
The Porto Vecchio with Piazza Unità d'Italia

The Free Port of Trieste is a port in the Adriatic Sea in Trieste, Italy. It is the most important commercial port of Italy, with a trade volume between 55 and 59 million tonnes.

It is subdivided into five different Free Areas, three of which have been allotted to commercial activities. The remaining two, the Mineral Oils Free Area and the "Canale di Zaule" Free Area, are used for industrial activities. The port is articulated in various terminals, managed by private companies.

== History ==
Steam launch alongside an Austro-Hungarian cruiser, before 1918, photo by Rudolf Bruner-Dvořák

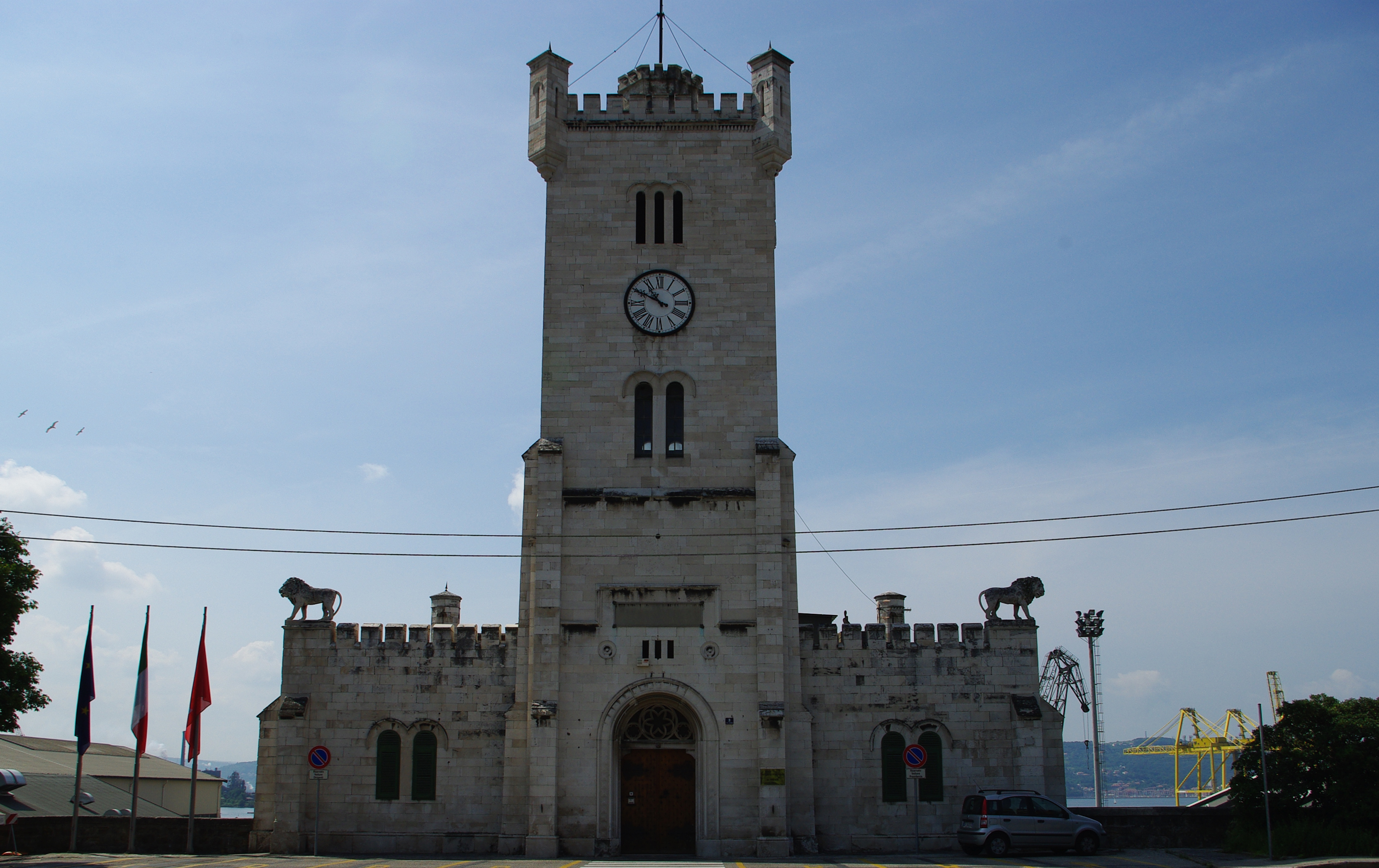
Headquarters (Lloyd Tower)

In the period between the beginning of 1700 and 1850, Trieste was mainly an emporium and was given the status of Free Port by Charles VI, Holy Roman Emperor in 1719. In 1740, when Empress Maria Theresa of Austria took power, one of the first measures she adopted was to extend the borders of the Free Port area to the periphery of the town, thereby merging the emporium, the port, the new city and the old one. The Empress decided to extend the exemptions from customs duties to the whole city, which attracted many people from different countries and all walks of life (Italians, Serbians, Slovenians, Croats, Jews and Greeks): for them a law was passed, the "Editto di tolleranza", which provided for the freedom of worship, the possibility to negotiate freely and to own goods.

In the 1770s and 1780s, the Trieste Company (sometimes known as the "Austrian East India Company") attempted to connect directly the Habsburg Empire to the Indian and Chinese markets.

It appeared that it was necessary to enlarge the port infrastructure and the railway network. In 1857 the Südbahn (Southern) Railway line became operational along the northeastern route: Trieste, Postojna, Ljubljana, Graz, Vienna, with further links to Budapest and the Balkans. The railway element was central in the design of the port structures. In Trieste it was the Lagerhäuser system of Northern European ports that was used as a model. A French engineer, Paulin Talabot, designed the project. 1868 marks the beginning of Trieste as a commercial port whose infrastructures were to be developed in four different periods. To tackle the competition of Northern ports, which had been able to attract trade because of the lack of railway connections with Trieste, and to adjust to the needs of non-European maritime transport, which was to increase after the opening of the Suez Canal in 1869 - with the consequent shortening of the distance separating Trieste from Bombay by 7,500 miles - in 1868 the construction of the current Porto Vecchio (the Old Port, at the time called Porto Nuovo, the New Port) was started. The Northern part of the port was built between 1868 and 1883 together with the outer breakwater and other sea infrastructure.

On December 22, 1871, the new monthly service linking Trieste with Bombay was established. In 1874 a contract was signed with the Südbahn for the development of the port and in 1879 the Magazzini Generali (the warehouses) were erected. In the same year the Pontebbana railway line was officially opened connecting Trieste, Udine, Pontebba, Villach, Salzburg and Munich.

In 1891 the port became a free port and was separated from the rest of the town by an enclosure. The status of free port, which had been previously extended to the whole city, was now being limited to this area, while the city became physically separated from it. In the period between 1901 and 1914 the works began to enlarge the river area (the embankment), to build the Bersaglieri Wharf, the Scalo Legnami (the timber pier) and S. Andrea port (piers V and VI). The fourth period, between 1924 and 1936, is characterised by the realisation of major public works, which were to complete the sea infrastructures, the port equipment on piers V and VI, the Silo, the Stazione Marittima (the passenger station), and the Idroscalo (the air harbour).

After reconstructing the buildings damaged by the bombings of the Second World War, an innovative port reorganisation was started in line with the needs of the containerisation and the new transport systems.

== The Free Port ==
Under free port regulations goods reaching the port by land from Italy or the EU are considered definitively exported, and goods of foreign origin arriving by land are considered foreign goods in transit. Goods arriving from abroad by sea may transit freely and be sent to their foreign destinations. By virtue of exclusive regulations on customs credits, customs duties on goods destined for import may be paid after 6 months at reduced annual interest rates. The port's special extra-customs status also allows commercial operations to be carried out on goods deposited under the foreign regimen. Repackaging, labelling, industrial processing etc. are also possible under the same terms. Besides being the responsibility of the Port Authority (a publicly run body) management of the port's warehouses is also conducted by many private companies - forwarding companies or port terminal operators - working in complete autonomy within the Port Authority regulations.

The status of the Free Port Zones has remained a distinctive feature of the Port of Trieste throughout its history. Granted in 1719 by the Habsburg monarchy and restricted in 1891, this special status has been confirmed by subsequent peace treaties, by the European Community and by the Italian Parliament. Most port land is subject to this rule and therefore lies outside the jurisdiction of European Union Customs.

Five Free Port Zones are defined as follows:

- Old Free Zone
- New Free Zone
- Timber Terminal Free Zone
- Mineral Oil Free Zone
- Industrial Free Zone

The Old Free Port, the most ancient complex of facilities, was designed by Paul Talabot and built between 1868 and 1883 according to a port and railway development plan aimed at consolidating the role of Trieste as a trading centre for all territories under Austro-Hungarian rule. A modern multipurpose terminal, the Adria Terminal, has recently been created alongside the older installations.

The New Free Port is the result of a project begun in the early 20th century in response to the growth of trade with the Middle East and Far East created by the opening of the Suez Canal. Completed to a large extent in the 1920s and 1930s, it has been further extended since the 1960s with the development of a container terminal at Pier 7 and a ro-ro/ferry terminal at Riva Traiana. The remaining Free Zones include - in addition to the timber and oil terminals - part of the Zaule industrial canal, which serves the (EZIT) Industrial District, established after the Second World War.

== The hydrodynamic plant ==
The hydrodynamic plant, built in 1890, is an important piece of industrial archaeology. Together with Hamburg, Buenos Aires, Calcutta and Genoa, Trieste was one of the first ports in the world to be equipped with a hydrodynamic plant.

The building is located behind the pier and is characterised by a high brick smokestack and two square towers at the sides of the main facade.

The plant, which ceased to be used in 1983, took the water from the water system and supplied energy to the different points of consumption. It was, therefore, a centralised energy generator, which operated the quay cranes, the external cranes and the internal hoists of the port warehouses.

A series of two-flue Lancashire boilers with a 2.10m diameter and a 10m length, built by St. Jashka & Sohn from Vienna, produced steam with a pressure of 7 atmospheres. The steam was delivered to four main machines and an auxiliary one, all manufactured by Maschinenbau Aktien Gesellschaft vormals Breitfeld, Danek & Com. Prag-Karolinenthal.

The main machines had a higher motive part and a lower operating one. The motive part – a 25 horsepower (19 kW) double expansion steam engine – had a central high-pressure cylinder with a 450 mm diameter and two lateral low-pressure cylinders of 600 mm diameter. A system of crankshaft rods ensured the correct timing of the three cylinders. Hydraulic pressure was kept constant by means of hydraulic accumulators. Two of them were located in the towers of the plant and one was situated in the tower near the port gates, in a more central position.

Pressurised water was distributed along the port main axis through a 6.8 km long system of cast-iron pipes, installed in underground passages that could be inspected. The main pipeline branched out into secondary pipes connected to the individual points of consumption. In the years between 1920 and 1939 the plant operated 83 quay cranes, 31 external cranes for the warehouses and 57 hoists.

The hydrodynamic plant - a rare example of machines that worked for more than a century - is located in a Rundbogenstil building, an architectural style that was a German version of Romanesque, very popular at the time.

== The Porto Vecchio ==
The link between city and port, tied together within a single process of urban and historical development, becomes evident in the Porto Vecchio area, with an architectural heritage of great historical and artistic value. Porto Vecchio, located in the heart of the city, covers an area of about 600,000 sq.m. and represents a jewel to be relaunched through the identification of new functions.

The "capannoni", the oldest buildings of the port, were erected after the model of the Lagerhäuser, a word which refers to those parts of a city that are used for goods handling and include warehouses for the storage and stocking of goods, from their arrival in port to their shipment and distribution.

The port system visually links Miramare Castle, Barcola and San Giusto Castle and follows three directions: a central one, connecting the port with the city, a second one, corresponding to the piers, and a third one, adjacent to the railway.

The classification of warehouses and hangars (initially 38 main bodies) comprises three groups of buildings:

- one-storey above-ground buildings
- two or three-storey above-ground buildings, with cellars and garrets, with galleries that link the avant-corpses and are supported by cast-iron mullions
- four-storey above-ground buildings, with cellars, ground floors and four higher floors with galleries

The warehouses were initially equipped with cranes, elevators, hoists and other lifting equipment, which were used for goods loading and unloading and were hydraulically operated. The buildings of the first and second groups have a perron (a raised platform, about 1 meter high, used to perform loading and unloading operations with railway cars), while those of the third group, erected in more recent years (at the beginning of 1900), show entrance doors at ground level as well.

The architectural features of these monumental buildings lie in the vertical and horizontal lines along the facades, in the geometric definition of the basements, the doors, the windows and all the elements of the architectonic language of this complex.

Along the facade, the horizontal lines (the stringcourses, for instance) give the buildings a longitudinal appearance, while the vertical lines (pilaster strips and avant-corpses) create interruptions. Through the harmonisation of the lines, the structural elements take up an architectural character. The main body of the facades, from the base to the superstructure, shows unity and dimensional value.

At the time of the construction, decorating was achieved through the use of different finishing materials and the work of master decorators and stone-dressers. Cornices, modillions, capitals, basements, windowsills and avant-corpses made of different materials produce a suggestive effect, which is enhanced by the materials' natural colours creating a uniform chromatic impression.

Grey cast-iron mullions are a distinctive feature of hangars' ground floors.

Each building is an example of the technical architecture at the end of the 19th century, a period of transition for the construction principles and configuration of maritime structures, which were adjusting to a defensive function and to the new trend of equipment mechanisation.

== Warehouse 26 ==
Warehouse 26, a monumental building, covers an area of 9,000 sq.m., with a face of about 244m, an underground floor used as a cellar, a ground floor, three higher floors and a garret. It was completed in 1893.

Because of the length of the building the design included two main stairs leading to the higher floors, seven elevators, eight lifts and two internal hatchways connected with the cellar.

The archivolt interrupts the monotonous shape of the windows, while the design of the main facade is consistent with the other buildings.

The warehouse features turrets above the finishing cornices, decorated mansard roofs, and a clock tower as part of its architectural design. The rows of cast-iron mullions and the avant-corpses give the whole building an extraordinary perspective.

== See also ==
- Fincantieri
- Italia Marittima
