= MV Oceania (1932) =

Italian ocean liner

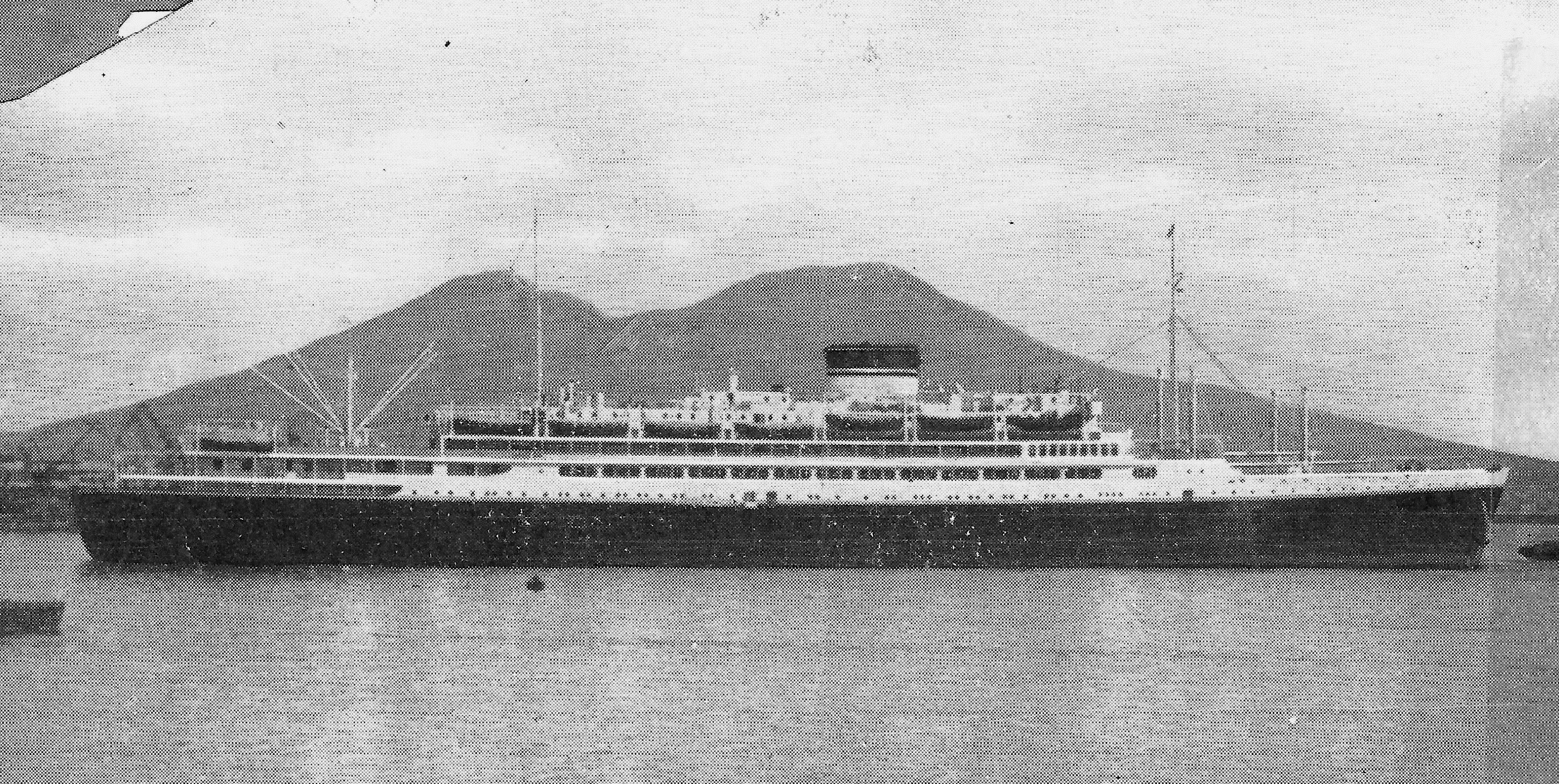
- MV Oceania in 1934.

History
- Name: Oceania
- Owner: Italia Societa Anonima di Navigazione
- Builder: Cantieri Riuniti dell' Adriatico
- Yard number: 253
- Launched: 29 August 1932
- Completed: July 1933
- Acquired: July 1933
- In service: July 1933
- Out of service: 18 September 1941
- Identification: IBJK; Official number: 340
- Fate: Sunk on 18 September 1941

General characteristics
- Type: Ocean liner
- Tonnage: 19,507 GRT
- Length: 179.7 m (589 ft 7 in)
- Beam: 23.4 m (76 ft 9 in)
- Depth: 13.9 m (45 ft 7 in)
- Installed power: 4 x 8 cyl. FIAT 2 SCAS diesel engines
- Propulsion: Four screws
- Speed: 19.5 knots

MV Oceania was an Italian ocean liner that was torpedoed by the British submarine HMS Upholder in the Mediterranean Sea off Tripoli, Libya (33°02′N 14°42′E) on 18 September 1941 while on route from Taranto, Italy to Tripoli, while carrying Italian troops to Northern Africa.

== Construction ==
Oceania was built at the Cantieri Riuniti dell' Adriatico shipyard in Monfalcone, Italy and completed in 1933 for Italian Line (Italia Società Anonima di Navigazione) of Genoa. The ship was 179.7 metres (589 ft 7 in) long, had a beam of 13.4 metres (44 ft 0 in) and a depth of 13.9 metres (45 ft 7 in). It was assessed at 19,507 gross register tons (GRT) and had four 8-cylinder FIAT 2 SCAS diesel engines driving four screw propellers. The ship could reach a speed of 19.5 knots (36.1 km/h; 22.4 mph) and could generate 4,888 nhp. It had a sister ship named Neptunia.

== War career and sinking ==
Oceania and her sister ship Neptunia were both converted to troop transport ships in June 1941. While sailing in a convoy east of Tripoli, Libya, on 31 August 1941, the sister ships were attacked by the British submarine HMS Upholder. The submarine fired four torpedoes from a large distance towards the ships, but all four failed to hit their targets. The ships arrived safely thereafter in Tripoli.

Oceania and its sister ship were part of another heavily guarded convoy, which left Taranto, Italy bound for Tripoli, while carrying Italian troops for the campaign in Northern Africa. On 18 September 1941, while 112 kilometres (70 mi) northeast of Tripoli, four submarines laid in wait to attack the convoy as its position had been discovered. Neptunia was struck by two torpedoes around 4.10pm and sank shortly thereafter, while Oceania was torpedoed later in the day, but stayed afloat. The damaged ship was taken in tow by two of the six accompanying destroyers so it could be taken in for repairs. However, Upholder fired two more torpedoes towards Oceania, both hit their target and the ship sank 8 minutes later. A total of 5,395 survivors from Neptunia and Oceania were rescued from the water, while 384 people are believed to have gone down with Oceania.

== Wreck ==
The wreck of Oceania is believed to lay at 33°02′N 14°42′E. However, the wreck has yet to be discovered.
