= Port of Palermo =

Coordinates: 38°07′50″N 13°21′53″E

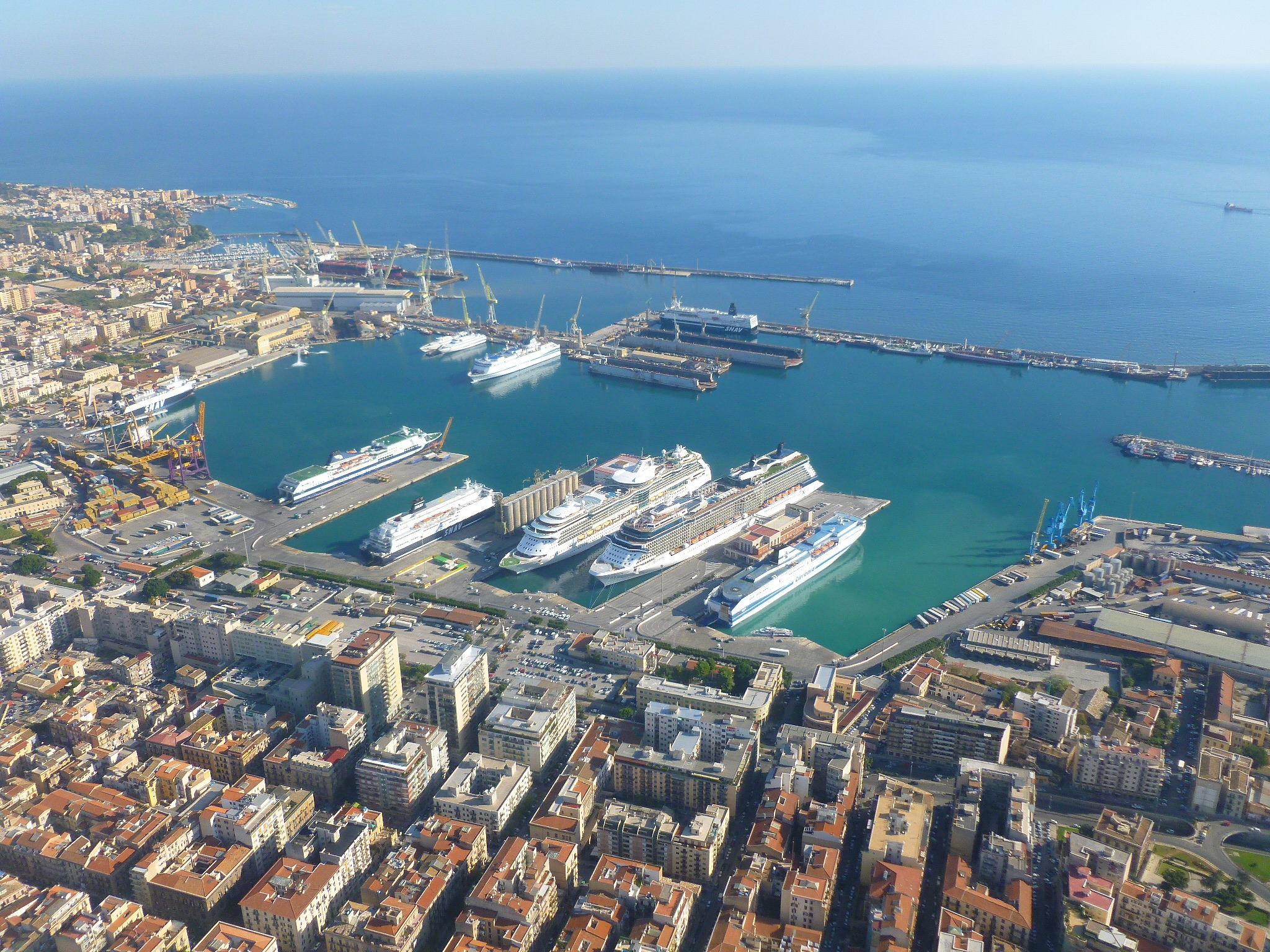
- Harbour
- Interactive map of Port of Palermo

Location
- Country: Italy
- Location: Palermo

Details
- Owned by: Port Authority of Western Sicily
- Type of harbour: Natural/Artificial

Statistics
- Vessel arrivals: 3,677 vessels (2018)
- Annual cargo tonnage: 6,189,091 tonnes (2018)
- Passenger traffic: 1,986,941 (2018)
- Website www.adsppalermo.it

Port of Palermo (Italian: Porto di Palermo) is a port serving Palermo, Sicily, Italy.

The port of Palermo is one of the major ports for passenger traffic in the Mediterranean. According to author Patrizia Fabbri the port has been "a constant driving force not only for the island's economy, but in the history of the city of Palermo". It stretches for a few kilometers away from Francesco Crispi, near the ancient port of Cala, incorporating areas including Arenella and Acqua Santa. In 2018 6,189,091 tonnes and 1,986,941 passengers (of which 577,934 are cruise passengers) passed through the port.

The port area includes the shipyard run by Fincantieri with its two graving docks.
