= SMS Natter (1896) =

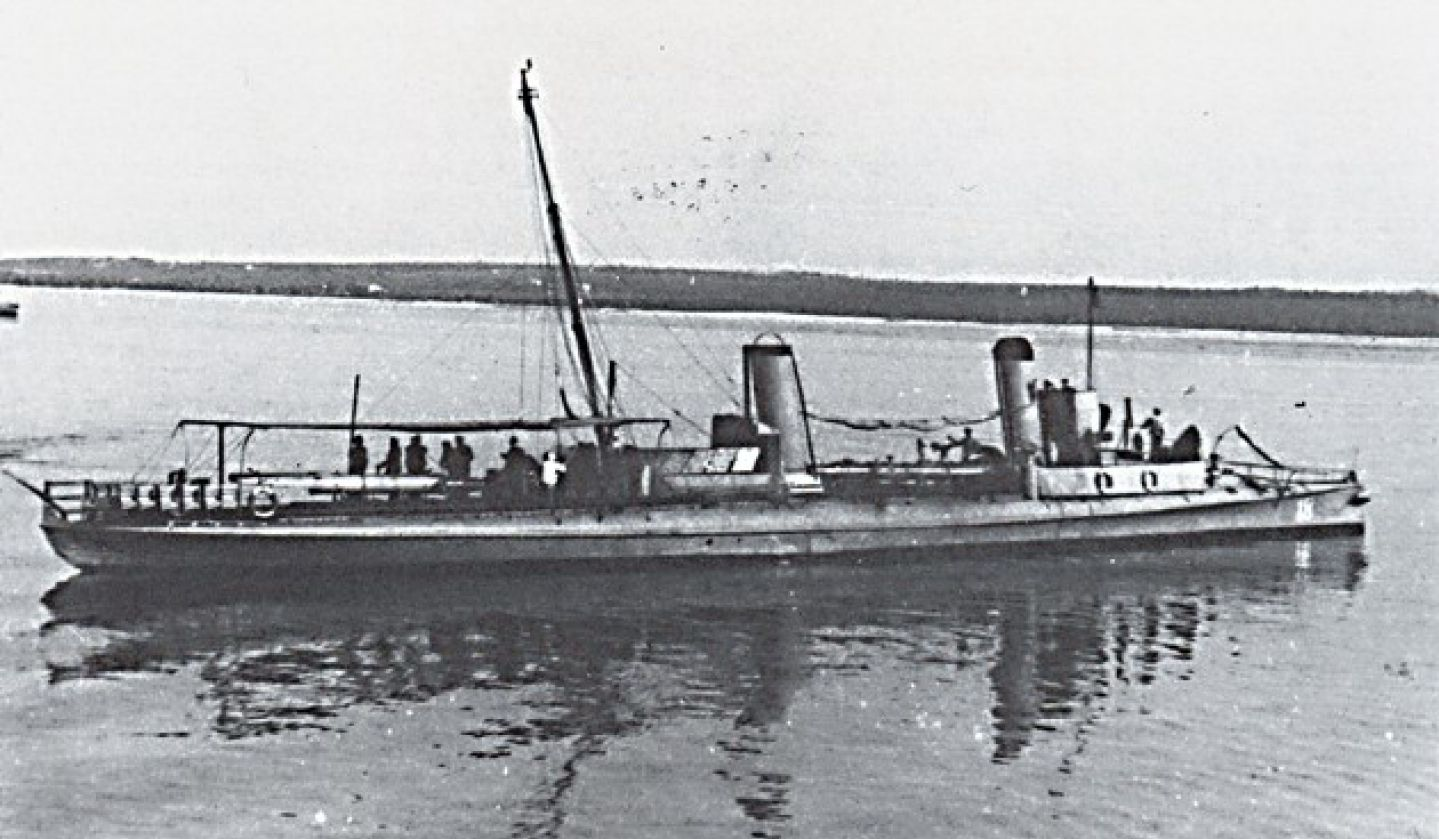

History
- Name: SMS Natter
- Builder: Yarrow Shipbuilders, England
- Laid down: 1895
- Launched: 1896
- Completed: October 1896
- Renamed: Torpedoboot 17, 1910
- Fate: Sold for scrapping, 1920

General characteristics
- Displacement: 134 long tons (136 t)
- Length: 45.9 m (150 ft 7 in)
- Beam: 5.3 m (17 ft 5 in)
- Draft: 2.7 m (8 ft 10 in)
- Propulsion: Reciprocating engines, 2,300 hp (1,715 kW)
- Speed: 26.5 knots (49.1 km/h; 30.5 mph)
- Complement: 21
- Armament: 2 × 47 mm (1.9 in) L/33 guns; 3 × 45 cm (17.7 in) torpedo tubes

SMS Natter (Note: "SMS" stands for "Seiner Majestät Schiff ", or "His Majesty's Ship" in German.) was a torpedo boat of the Austro-Hungarian Navy. Natter was built by the German shipbuilder Schichau-Werke between 1895 and 1896. She was renamed Torpedoboot 18 (abbreviated Tb 18) in 1910 and used for local coast defence during the First World War. She was scrapped in 1920.

== Design ==
In 1895, the Austro-Hungarian Navy purchased one prototype torpedo boat each from the British shipbuilder Yarrow and the German shipbuilder Schichau-Werke, two specialist builders of torpedo vessels.

Schichau's design was 47.3 m (155 ft 2 in) long overall and 45.9 m (150 ft 7 in) between perpendiculars, with a beam of 5.3 m (17 ft 5 in) and a draught of 2.7 m (8 ft 10 in). (Note: Conways gives a draught of 2.8 m (9 ft 2 in).) Displacement was 134 t (132 long tons) normal and 152 t (150 long tons) full load. Two coal-fired Thornycroft-Schutz water-tube boilers fed a single three-cylinder triple expansion steam engine which drove a single propeller shaft. The machinery was rated at 2,300 indicated horsepower (1,700 kW) giving a speed of 26.5 knots (49.1 km/h; 30.5 mph). (Note: 2,200 ihp (1,600 kW) giving a speed of 24 knots (44 km/h; 28 mph) according to Conway's.) 30 tons of coal were carried, giving an endurance of 2,600 nmi (3,000 mi; 4,800 km) at 12 knots (22 km/h; 14 mph).

The ship was armed by two 47-millimetre (1.9 in) L/33 Skoda guns and three 450 mm (17.7 in) torpedo tubes. The ship had a crew of 21.

== Construction and service ==
The Schichau torpedo boat, named Natter, was laid down at Schichau's Elbing, Prussia (now Elbląg in Poland) shipyard in 1895, and launched in February 1896, later than the competing Yarrow-built torpedo boat Viper. Testing, which was delayed by ice in the Baltic, showed a number of problems, including vibrations at high speed, cracking of the propeller shafts and failure of hull frames in the ship's stern. Attempts to rectify these faults included reinforcing the hull and experiments with different propellers, but were only partly successful. She was completed in November 1896. While both torpedo boats had similar stability and seaworthiness, Natter continued to suffer from vibrations at high speed, which prevented the German-built ship from reaching its contract speed due to fear of vibration-induced These problem stopped the German-built ship becoming fully operational, and was instead used as a mobile torpedo-battery at the port of Pola (now Pula in Croatia). Further orders went to Yarrow.

In 1910, Austria renamed most of its torpedo boats, with Natter becoming Tb 18. In 1910–1911, Tb 18 was rearmed, with the two torpedo tubes mounted on the ship's beams replaced by a single centreline tube. At the outbreak of the First World War, Tb 18 formed part of the Minesweeping flotilla of the Pola Local Defence Forces. She was employed on training duties in the war, and in 1917 was again rearmed, with a twin torpedo tube mount replacing one of the single tubes. Tb 18 was allocated to Great Britain as a War reparation as part of the Treaty of Saint-Germain-en-Laye in 1919. She was scrapped in Italy in 1920.
