= Mark Voris =

American painter

- Born: Mark Harvey Voris; September 10, 1907; Franklin, Indiana
- Died: Tucson, Arizona; August 8, 1974
- Education: Franklin College, Art Institute of Chicago, the Institute de Allende in Mexico and University of Arizona
- Known for: Art; Painting, Ceramics
- Movement: Work Progress Administration, Regionalism, Modernism

Mark Voris (1907–1974) was an American born artist and ceramicist who had a significant impact on the artistic development of Tucson and Arizona, both through his leadership with the Work Progress Administration (WPA) and his tenure as a professor at the University of Arizona.

== Life and Art ==
Born in Franklin, Indiana on September 10, 1907, Voris received considerable schooling in art during a period before degrees. He attended Franklin College from 1924 to 1925.

Voris moved to Tucson in 1923 and worked as a commercial artist and received many prizes for his works in oil, watercolor and ceramics. Attending the University of Arizona from 1926 to 1929 he ultimately attained a Bachelor of Fine Arts degree from the University of Arizona in 1956. Voris spent four winters studying with Paul Dougherty.

The early Voris paintings are Arizona landscapes that glow and flow in ways that show the influence of European artists blending in a visual magnificence when combined with the openness of the west. The 1938 oil painting "Cholla" is an almost Cézanne-like form, the trees creating their own spatial structure.

He worked with the Tucson Fine Arts Association serving as the president, was a founder of the Tucson Festival Society and the Palette and Brush Club.

As a painter Voris received national recognition. His major shows included the Whitney Museum of Art in New York, the Rockefeller Center in New York, the DeYoung Museum in San Francisco, the New York Museum of Modern Art and the Denver Museum. Sole exhibits were held at the Liever Art Galleries in Indianapolis, Laguna Beach, the University of Arizona and Cochise College.

== WPA ==
Artist in Tucson who were engaged in work for the WPA in 1934 were Stella Roca, Lucy Drake Marlow, Louise Norton, and Voris. In 1934 Voris completed a number of federal works including a large oil landscape titled "the Brook" and numerous watercolors of Tucson scenes. Voris served as state director of the Federal Arts Project, a division of the Work Progress Administration, from 1936 until WWII.

== University of Arizona ==
Starting in 1946, Voris began teaching at the University of Arizona. He served as the acting head of the UA Art Department from 1962 to 1963. There was a public lamentation when Voris announced his retirement from the art faculty. The Tucson Daily Citizen wrote: "I don't want to give the bare facts about Mark Voris, but rather the terrible loss his retirement brings to the art department. How can one replace the talent, genuineness, gentility, and energy by articulating just the facts."

In a Memorial Resolution written by his colleges including Lez L. Haas, Robert Quinn, Gordon Heck, and Andrew Buchhauser they wrote: "As artist and teacher, Mark Voris' greatest gift lay in design. He drew with facility, and painted and potted with vigor and grace. However what made is work so attractive was its design, its sense of inevitable rightness. He combined the restrained perfection of the classical approach with the subtle certainty for the Japanese craftsman. His unerring eye applied equally to form, color and decoration, bringing them together in such complete natural coordination that any alteration was unthinkable. His pictures combined strength with elegance in a provocative and characteristic manner. His was an exceedingly personal and communicative art."

== Ceramics ==
Voris moved away from painting towards ceramics in 1964 after developing visual loss in both eyes. The ceramic forms are elegant mid-century studio work that reference the forms and tonality of the southwest.

== Legacy ==
Voris died at the age of 66 on August 8, 1974 having touched the lives and impacted the work of hundred of students. In 1982 the University of Arizona Joseph Gross Gallery mounted a retrospective exhibit of Voris's work looking at 40 years.
