= Stella Roca =

American painter

- Born: Stella McLennan; 1879; Nebraska City, Nebraska, US
- Died: 1954 (aged 74–75); Tucson, Arizona, US
- Education: Art Institute of Chicago, and Omaha Institute
- Known for: Art; Painting
- Movement: American Impressionism, Works Progress Administration, and Regionalism

Stella McLennan Roca (1879–1954) was an American-born artist who influenced the artistic development of Tucson and Arizona. Roca was an early member of Tucson's Art Colony, worked for the Works Progress Administration (WPA) and exhibited throughout the United States.

== Life and art ==
Born to William and Margaret Frances Brown McLennan, Stella grew up in Nebraska City, Nebraska, graduating from St. Joseph's Academy. She attended the Art Institute of Chicago for five years earning her certificate from there in 1908 and the Omaha Institute. She married shortly after graduating from the Chicago Art Institute. She and her mother were vacationing in Portland, Oregon, and Stella received an offer through the Art Institute to teach at a large hacienda near Durango, Mexico. She accepted that position and spent two years in New Mexico. After moving to Tucson in 1918 Roca became a key member of the arts community. She exhibited in 1920 at the Moore & O'Neall Congress Street Bookstore. Stella married Lautaro Roca in 1911. Lautaro died 24 July 1939 in San Francisco County, California. Throughout the 1920s she and her son Paul Roca traveled the American West Coast and Mexico. She was inspired by the landscapes of Arizona and Old Mexico and took up painting.

Roca took "up the study of Arizona color, giving special attention to a broader technique. She told the Arizona Daily Star, "I am constantly keeping before me the thought that I must not be satisfied to stop for even one moment, but must be ever striving for greater attainments."

Roca primarily worked in watercolor and oils and exhibited in Omaha in 1923 and she was described by the Daily Star as: "A fascinating woman with her black hair forming a perfect frame for her rather oval face, a turquoise blouse leaded [sic?] in white accentuating the deep blue of her eyes, every movement one of grace she talked of Tucson, and her work [...] It is a distinct pleasure to listen to the cadences of her voice as she talks of the customs of Old Mexico."

"Tucson has really an amazing number of interesting residents, I don't believe that I know of any other city of the same size which can boast of so many artists, musicians, poets - all manner of people who are thoroughly enjoyable." Roca summered at her home in Nebraska City, Nebraska. In 1932, Roca was elected president of the Tucson Fine Arts Association and in 1936 she spent part of the year in Washington DC.

Her work was known for light colored desert landscapes and glowing mountains. She exhibited in Tucson at Studio Strange and showed at the University of Arizona Arizona State Museum in 1945.

Roca was a member of Tucson's important arts organizations, including the Palette and Brush Club. In the early 1950s she served as chairman of the Independent Artist Show, She was featured in the "Who's Who in American Art," and "American Women."

== WPA ==
Artists in Tucson who were engaged in work for the WPA in 1934 were Mark Voris, Lucy Drake Marlow, Louise Norton, and Roca.

== Legacy ==
Roca died in 1954, having impacted the development of landscape painting in Southern Arizona and the development of Art Historical development in Arizona.
