= Barbara Rogers =

Barbara Rogers may refer to:

- Barbara Rogers (artist) (born 1937), American painter and art educator
- Barbara Rogers-Low (1920–2019), American biochemist and biophysicist
- Barbara Newhall Follett (1914 – disappeared 1939), American child prodigy novelist, married name Rogers
- Barbara Rogers (TV personality), or Barbie Rogers, Australian model and TV personality, see Logie Awards of 1973
