= Chuck Connelly =

American painter (1955–2025)

- Born: January 7, 1955; Pittsburgh, Pennsylvania, U.S.
- Died: April 13, 2025 (aged 70); Philadelphia, Pennsylvania, U.S.
- Education: Tyler School of Art
- Website: chuckconnelly.org

John Charles Connelly (January 7, 1955 – April 13, 2025) was an American painter.

== Background ==
John Charles Connelly was born in Pittsburgh, Pennsylvania, on January 7, 1955. He graduated from the Tyler School of Art in Elkins Park, Pennsylvania, in 1977.

== Career ==
After graduating, Connelly moved from the Philadelphia area to New York City, where Robert C. Atkins became one of his first patrons.

Connelly went on to spend two years in Germany, where he continued to develop his art work under the patronage of Atkins. Upon his return to New York in the early 1980s, the Annina Nosei Gallery began to show his work. During this time, Connelly began to rise to fame along with Julian Schnabel and Jean-Michel Basquiat in the New York City art world.

A movie (the "Life Lessons" segment of New York Stories), directed by Martin Scorsese featured Nick Nolte as a Soho painter. Chuck's hands, painting and paintings were featured as Nolte's. Not long after the film's release, Page Six asked Connelly what he thought of the film, and he replied "well, it wasn't Raging Bull". which angered Scorsese so much so that he never spoke to Chuck again.

The Art of Failure: Chuck Connelly Not for Sale, an Emmy award-winning documentary directed by Jeff Stimmel, premiered at the L.A. Film Festival in June 2008 and was shown on HBO in July. The documentary chronicles Connelly as he struggles with his temperament, alcoholism, and disillusionment with reality. These factors culminate in the alienation of gallery owners, collectors, and his wife; serving to depress Connelly further. The documentary details the tragedy of the fallen artist as he fights to maintain his dignity and integrity.

On June 15, 2010, Connelly started a new web show called Stream of Thought.

A second full-length documentary celebrating the life of the artist, Chuck Connelly: Into the Light, had its U.S. premiere on October 29, 2020, at the SCAD Savannah Film Festival and has been winning first place in documentaries at film festivals across the country ever since.

== Personal life and death ==
Connelly's first marriage, to Swiss artist Laurence Groux, ended with their divorce in 2005. In 2021, he married Adrienne Mooney.

Connelly died from prostate cancer at his home in Philadelphia, on April 13, 2025, at the age of 70.

== Bibliography ==
=== Selected solo exhibitions ===
- Chuck Connelly: Westward Bound, Peters Projects, Santa Fe, NM (2015)
- Chuck Connelly: Rediscovery, Trigg Ison Fine Art, Beverly Hills, CA (Oct–Nov 2009)
- Selected Work 1977–2008, DFN Gallery, New York, NY (2008)
- In Fashion, Knapp Gallery, Philadelphia, PA (2008)
- East Oak Lane, DFN Gallery, New York, NY (2007
- DFN Gallery, New York, NY (2005)
- Edward Tyler Nahem Fine Arts, New York, NY (2004)
- Lennon, Weinberg, New York, NY (2002)
- Chuck Connelly: Paintings 1996–2001, Galerie L'Enfant, Washington DC (2001)
- Chuck Connelly: Paintings 1990–1998, Galerie L'Enfant, Washington DC (1999)
- Lennon, Weinberg, New York, NY (1999)
- Alexander de Folin, New York, NY (1998)
- Alexander de Folin, New York, NY (1997)
- Lennon, Weinberg, New York, NY (1996)
- Chuck Connelly: Flowers, Exhibition Space, Elizabeth Moore, curated by Mary Lou Swift (1994)
- Lennon, Weinberg, New York, NY (1994)
- Locks Gallery, Philadelphia, PA (1993)
- Chuck Connelly: Portraits, Lennon, Weinberg, New York, NY (1992)
- Locks Gallery, Philadelphia, PA (1991)
- Chuck Connelly: New Paintings 1989–1990, Lennon, Weinberg, New York, NY (Catalogue) (1990)
- Chuck Connelly: New Paintings, Lennon, Weinberg, New York, NY (1989)
- Chuck Connelly, Thomas Segal Gallery, Boston, MA (1998)
- Galleria La Planita, Rome, Italy (Catalogue) (1987)
- Chuck Connelly, Annina Nosei Gallery, New York, NY (1987)
- Chuck Connelly, Asher/Faure Gallery, Los Angeles, CA (1986)
- Annina Nosei Gallery, New York, NY (1986)
- Chuck Connelly: Paintings, Lawrence Oliver Gallery, Philadelphia, PA (1985)
- Chuck Connelly: Paintings, Annina Nosei Gallery, New York, NY (Catalogue) (1985)
- Northern Illinois University Art Gallery, Chicago, IL (1984)
- Serra di Felice Gallery, New York, NY (1984)
- Chuck Connelly: Paintings, Annina Nosei Gallery, New York, NY (1984)
- Chuck Connelly: : Bilder and Sculpturen, Arno Cohen, Düsseldorf, West Germany (1982)

=== Public collections ===
- Broad Family Foundation, Santa Monica, CA
- Brooklyn Museum, New York, NY
- Davidson College, Davidson, NC
- Herbert F. Johnson Museum, Ithaca, NY
- J.B. Speed Museum, Louisville, KY
- Metropolitan Museum of Art, New York, NY
- Palm Springs Desert Museum, CA
- Portland Art Museum, OR
- Tampa Museum of Art, FL
- Tucson Museum of Art, AZ
- University of Arizona Museum of Art, Tucson, AZ

=== Exhibitions catalogues ===
- Chuck Connelly: East Oak Lane, New York, NY: DFN Gallery (2007)
- Chuck Connelly, New York, NY: DFN Gallery (2005)
- Chuck Connelly, Washington DC:Galerie L'Enfant (2001)
- THE FIGURE Another Side of Modernism, introduction by Olivia Georgia. Staten Island, NY: Snug Harbor Cultural Center (2000)
- Page, Judith. Chuck Connelly. New York, NY: Lennon, Weinberg, Inc. (1996)
- Lieberman, William S. American Narrative Painting and Sculpture: The 1980s.
  - From the Collection of the Metropolitan Museum of Art. Roslyn Harbor, NY: Nassau County Museum of Art (1991)
- Chuck Connelly. Introduction by J. Adams, B. Lennon. New York, NY, Lennon, Weinberg, Inc (1990)
- Pellizzi, Francesco et al. 1979–1989 American, Italian, Mexican Art from the Collection of Francesco Pellizzi, Hempstead, NY:
  - Hofstra Museum, Hofstra University (1989)
- Yau, John. "A Contemporary View of Nature," Aspects of Nature, Ridgefield, CT: Aldrich Museum of Contemporary Art (1986)
- Diacono, Mario. David Bowes, Michael Byron, Chuck Connelly, McDermott & McGough: The Burning Brush, Boston, MA:
  - Mario Diacono Gallery (1986)
- Chuck Connelly. Statement by the artist, Philadelphia, PA: Locks Gallery (1985)
- Becker, Robert. "Chuck Connelly's Architecture," Chuck Connelly, New York, NY: Annina Nosei Gallery (1985)

=== Film credits ===
- HBO Documentary Film Series, The Art of Failure: Chuck Connelly Not for Sale, Produced and Directed by Jeff Stimmel (2008)
- New York Stories, Life Lessons, Directed by Martin Scorsese and starring Nick Nolte; Featured paintings by Chuck Connelly (1989)
- A&E Television, BIOGRAPHY. Actor Nick Nolte (1999)
- Chuck Connelly: Into the Light, Produced by John Lizzio, Directed by Benjamin Schwartz (2020)

== Sources ==
- Chuck Connelly's
- New York Times – July 5, 2008
- Life – 30th Annual News & Documentary Emmy Awards September 21, 2009
