= Stimmel =

Stimmel is a surname of German origin. Notable people with the surname include:

- Archie Stimmel (1873–1958), American baseball player
- Ernst Stimmel (1891–1978), German actor
- Jeff Stimmel, American film director and producer
