= Lucy Drake Marlow =

American painter

- Born: Lucy Clare Drake; September 23, 1890; Erie, Pennsylvania, U.S.
- Died: July 6, 1979 (aged 88); Phoenix, Arizona, U.S.
- Education: Arts Students League for New York
- Known for: Painting
- Movement: Work Progress Administration, Regionalism, Modernism

Lucy Clare Marlow (née Drake; September 23, 1890 – July 6, 1978) was an American artist.

Born in Erie, Pennsylvania, she studied at the Catlin Art School and the Arts Students League for New York. For two years she was a pupil of George Elmer Browne in the West End School of Art at Provincetown, Massachusetts. She later studied portraiture in New York under Ernest L. Blumenschein and Eugene Speicher, and studied life painting for three years under Norwood McGilvary and illustration and design with Edmund Marion Ashe at Carnegie Mellon College of Fine Arts, Pittsburgh, Pennsylvania.

== Career ==
Marlow organized a summer art school Blooming Valley, Pennsylvania. She studied with Giovanni Romagnoli and exhibited in Erie Pennsylvania working principally in figure and portraits and she was a member of the board of the Associated Arts Society of Pittsburgh.

In 1927 Marlow opened a home in Tucson, Arizona and moved from Pittsburgh to the "Old Pueblo". In the late 1920s she showed with other Tucson-based women artists, including Louise Norton, Katherine Kitt, and Stella Roca.

Marlow made Tucson her permanent winter home and opened a studio in the second floor of the city's Temple of Music and Art. Throughout the late 1920s/30s she won a prizes for her art including, the annual art exhibition at the State Fair in Phoenix in 1928 and the Honorable Mention at an exhibit in Flagstaff, Arizona in 1930.

She won 1st Prize at the 1931 State Fair. Marlow was a member of the Tucson Palette and Brush Club and Tucson Art Group and as a member of the executive board of the Tucson Fine Arts Association. She was part of Tucson’s social set, hosting events and teas throughout the season.

In 1933, several of her paintings were accepted for exhibit in the Hoosier Salon at Marshall Field's in Chicago. and two of the pieces exhibited were included in a traveling exhibit. In 1938, her paintings were displayed at the Carnegie Museum in Pittsburgh.

== WPA ==
Marlow worked for the WPA in 1934 along with Stella Roca, Louise Norton, and Mark Voris.

== Personal life ==
Marlow was married to George A. Marlow and had a daughter, Lucy Jane Marlow (born 1921). Marlow died in 1978 in Phoenix, Arizona.
