= Tucson Museum of Art =

Art museum in Arizona

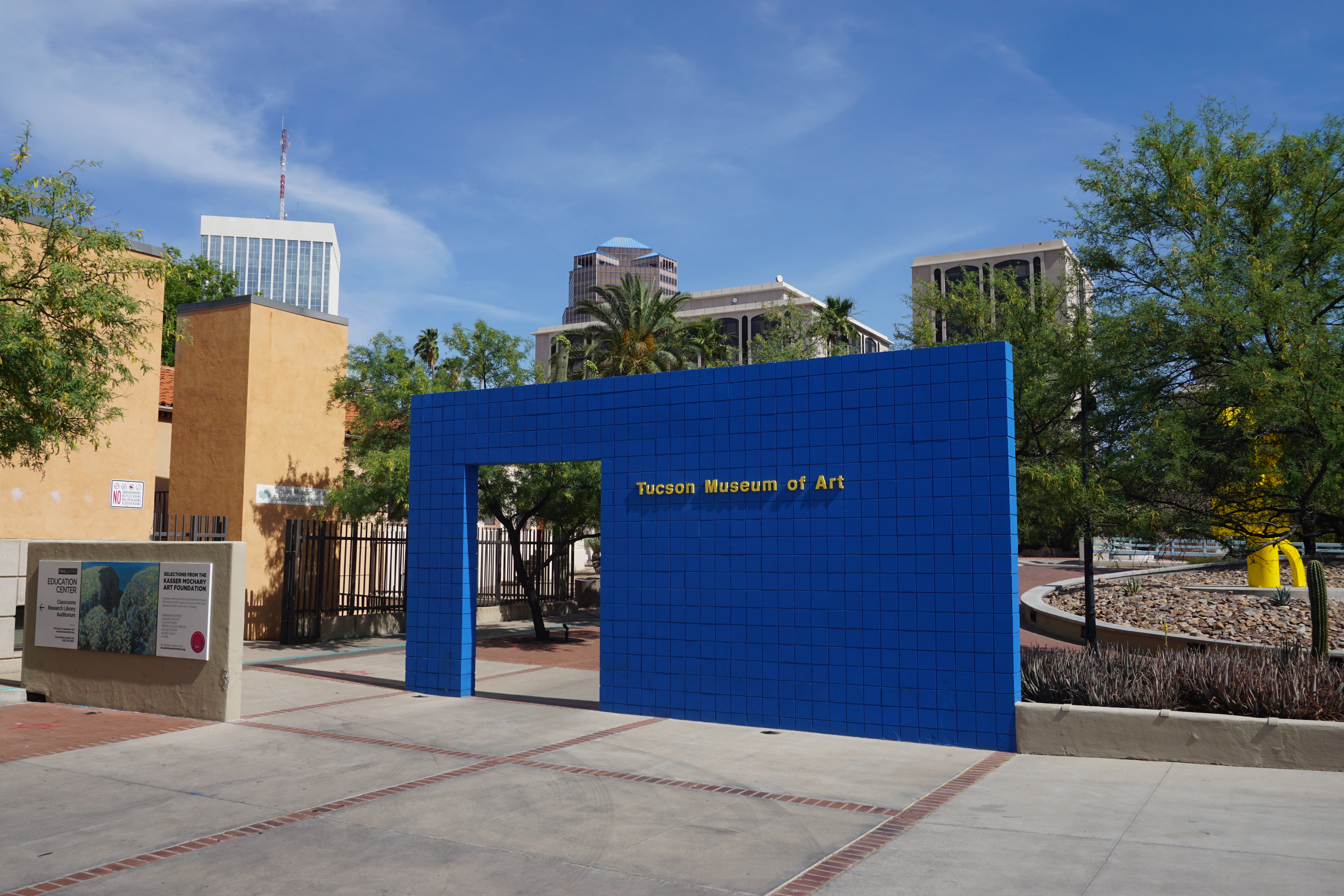
- Established: 1924
- Location: 140 N. Main Street; Tucson, Arizona
- Coordinates: 32.2234°N 110.9754°W
- Type: Art museum
- Website: www.tucsonmuseumofart.org

The Tucson Museum of Art and Historic Block (TMA) is an art museum and art education institution located in the Presidio District of downtown Tucson, Arizona. The museum comprises 74,000-square-feet of exhibition space over a four-acre city block that includes a contemporary main museum and 19th C. historic homes, including the Cordova House (1848), that have been adapted for reuse as the museum restaurant, pottery school, and galleries.

The museum concurrently presents eight to nine exhibitions including international and traveling exhibitions, TMA-curated exhibitions, and ongoing exhibitions of permanent collections. TMA's collection of more than 8,000 objects is focused on modern and contemporary art, Latin American, Western and Native American, and Asian art.

The museum has served as a community art education venue since its inception in 1924. Art education has continued as a major function of the museum through museum staff and a docent organization that carries out education and outreach programs.

The museum's campus of landscaped plazas host community and private events including artisans markets, festivals, live performances, an annual Día de los Muertos event, weddings, high school proms, award ceremonies, and other community events. The museum hosts Creative Space, an interactive space for children and families. The museum campus includes Cafe a la C'Art, a full-service restaurant and bakery that was ranked one of the top museum restaurants in the United States by Food & Wine Magazine. and the Museum Store, featuring original art and craft work by local and regional artists and artisans.

In 2015, the Tucson Museum of Art was named one of the Top Western Art Museums in the United States by True West magazine.

== History ==
Founded March 20, 1924 in the Presidio District of downtown Tucson, Arizona as the Tucson Fine Arts Association (TFAA), the museum was created by members of the Tucson Women's Club and 50 other Tucsonans, including founding TFAA board member Louise Norton. TFAA was initially a gallery and monthly lecture space. After the inauguration of the new Scott Avenue Temple of Music and Art in October 1927, the group relocated to the upstairs Temple Gallery. Exhibitions expanded and in 1941 TFAA presented Southwestern Oils, featuring works and a lecture series given by noted artist Maynard Dixon, hinted of its imminent growth into a major new art museum.

In 1947 artists and craftspeople presented A New Look at Art, the city's first non-juried exhibition of local artists, which drew 7,412 visitors.

The Craft Show was introduced in 1950, which became the Arizona Biennial, now the longest-running statewide biennial art exhibition in the state.

In 1967 the organization that would become the Tucson Museum of Art started a permanent collection based on several major donations. These gifts included significant collections of pre-Columbian, Spanish Colonial, and Western American art donated by Mr. and Mrs. Clay Lockett, Mr.and Mrs. John Frikart, as well as Mr. Thomas and Mrs. Cele Peterson. The largest donation was from Frederick R. Pleasants, whose pre-Columbian collection,"features nearly 600 objects including jewelry, ceremonial vessels, figurines, masks, sculptures, textiles, and feather arts. Collectively, the works represent approximately 3,000 years of history and 30 cultures spanning Mesoamerica (Mexico south through Central America, today’s Guatemala, Honduras, Belize, and El Salvador), the Intermediate Area (Panama, parts of Costa Rica, Nicaragua, Venezuela, Colombia, and Ecuador), and Central Andean region (Peru and Bolivia)".

Designed by Andy Anderson, a principal architect of the Tucson architecture firm founded by William Wilde, the main Museum was opened May 1, 1975 with the inaugural exhibition, Tucson Collects, which included loaned works from 43 personal collections of Tucsonans. Spanning 2000 years of art, representing works of art from Spanish Colonial to paintings and prints by Picasso, Thomas Gainsborough, John Singleton Copley, Renoir, Monet, Gilbert Stuart and Camille Pissarro. The museum drew 50,000 visitors in its first year. Reminiscent of the Guggenheim Museum in New York City, the Tucson Museum's main galleries are arranged as an open downward spiral around a "well" at the center that connects the levels and ramps.

In 1983 the Tucson Museum of Art presented "Sculptural Glass" which marked a major turning point in studio glass as it focused primarily on installations and brought together a very diverse group of artists, a majority of whom were women. A panel of four curators selected the artists: William Warmus (curator of Modern glass at the Corning Museum of Glass), Penelope Hunter-Stiebel (curator of 20th century art at the Metropolitan Museum of Art), Paul Smith, and Eason Eige.

TMA has curated original exhibitions drawing upon local collections, local artists and regional history, and presents contemporary traveling exhibitions. In 2014-2015 the TMA-curated exhibition The Figure Examined: Masterworks from the Kasser Mochary Art Foundation broke previous attendance records for a single exhibition with more than 30,000 visitors. The exhibition featured works by Pablo Picasso, Auguste Rodin and Henri Matisse, as well as works by Mary Cassatt, Lynn Chadwick, Marc Chagall, Jean Cocteau, Joseph Csaky, Salvador Dalí, Giorgio de Chirico, Edgar Degas, Eugène Delacroix, Raoul Dufy, Paul Gauguin, Alberto Giacometti, Francisco Goya, Oskar Kokoschka, Jacques Lipchitz, Édouard Manet, Amedeo Modigliani, Henry Moore, Jackson Pollock, Pierre-Auguste Renoir, Diego Rivera, Egon Schiele, Paul Signac, Alfred Sisley, Henri de Toulouse-Lautrec, Andy Warhol and Max Weber.

== Collections ==
The museum's permanent collection includes more than 8,000 objects in the areas of modern and contemporary art, Latin American, Western and Native American, and Asian art. The Latin America collection includes pre-Columbian art produced by Native Americans prior to the Spanish conquest in the sixteenth century. The pieces cover a time span of approximately 2,000 years, from 500 BC to 1500 AD, and include the Stela of Central Mexico dated between 100 BC and 250 BC and the Feline Head Fragment from Peru dated between 500 BC and 300 BC.

The museum began to collect modern art in the early 1970s. A donation of ninety-two objects from the Lawrence J. Heller collection of European and American modernists added works by Marsden Hartley, Arthur Dove, Max Weber, William Baziotes, Jacques Lipchitz, and Marino Marini.

The contemporary collection includes works by John Chamberlain, Chuck Close, Chuck Connelly (Bridge to Nowhere, 1988), Vernon Fisher, Jane Hammond, Jasper Johns, Robert Mangold, Olivier Mosset, Miriam Schapiro, James Turrell, and William T. Wiley, and contemporary artists of Arizona including; Barbara Rogers, James Pringle Cook, Jim Waid, and Bailey Doogan.

The Art of the American West Collection was established in the 1980s with a donation by Ileen B. and Samuel J. Campbell. The collection spans 200 years and includes works by Native American artists Maria Poveka Martinez, Emmi Whitehorse, and Fritz Scholder; and late 19th and early 20th century American West painters Charles Marion Russell, Rudolf Cronau, and Maynard Dixon; and contemporary Western artists Howard Post, Ed Mell, and Bill Schenck.

== Research library ==
The research library's non-circulating collection has more than 13,000 titles searchable through the Pima County Public Library online catalog. In addition to books, the collection contains art magazines, Museum publications, and other materials dedicated to the visual arts and Arizona artists. Material is included on Museum history, the Presidio San Augustin del Tucson and historic block, Art of the American West, Art of Latin America (pre-Columbian to the present), modern and contemporary art, general art history, American art, Oceanic art, African art, Asian art, and art education materials. The library also provides research assistance and referrals.

The research library contains a number of important and rare books. From Frederick Pleasants, curator of primitive art at the Brooklyn Museum from 1949 to 1956, the library has examples of very early research on Native American, African, and pre-Columbian art, as well as numerous facsimiles of pre-Columbian codices. From art historians Lee and Pam Parry, the library has a selection of books on 18th and 19th century American art, especially in the area of landscape and portrait painting.
