= The Art of Failure: Chuck Connelly Not for Sale =

- Genre: Documentary
- Directed by: Jeff Stimmel
- Starring: Chuck Connelly
- Music by: Paul A. Anderson
- Country of origin: United States
- Original language: English

Production
- Executive producers: Sheila Nevins; Diana Holtzberg
- Producer: Jeff Stimmel
- Cinematography: Atanasio di Felice; David Ford; Rob Forlenza; Andrij Parekh; Basia Winograd
- Editor: John Dowdell
- Running time: 60 minutes
- Production companies: HBO Documentary Films; BBC Storyville; ZDF/Arte; Films Transit International

Original release
- Network: HBO
- Release: July 7, 2008

The Art of Failure: Chuck Connelly Not for Sale is a 2008 American documentary television film produced and directed by Jeff Stimmel, about American artist Chuck Connelly. It premiered at the LA Film Festival on June 27, 2008, and was shown on HBO on July 7.

== Synopsis ==
The documentary chronicles the artist Chuck Connelly as he struggles with his temperament, alcoholism, and disillusionment with reality. These factors culminate in the alienation of gallery owners, collectors, and his wife; serving to depress Connelly further. The documentary details the tragedy of the fallen artist as he fights to maintain his dignity and integrity in the face of a world that refuses to accept him.

== Awards ==
The documentary won an Emmy at the 30th annual event in 2009 for the 'Outstanding Arts & Culture Programming' category.
