= Phoenix Art Museum =

Art museum in Arizona, US

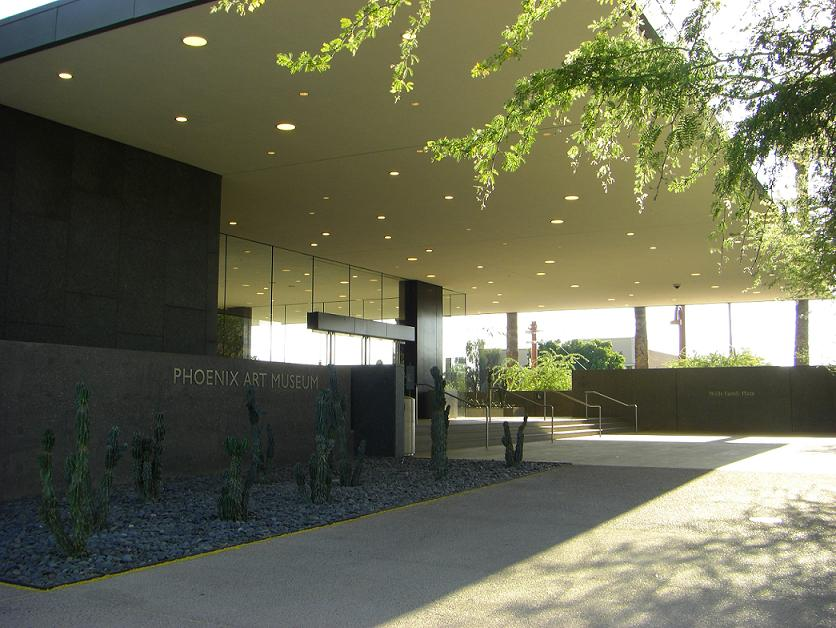
- Phoenix Art Museum's north entrance
- Established: 18 November 1959
- Location: 1625 North Central Avenue; Phoenix, Arizona 85004 United States
- Coordinates: 33.466749°N 112.072655°W
- Type: Art museum
- Public transit access: McDowell/Central Avenue
- Website: www.phxart.org

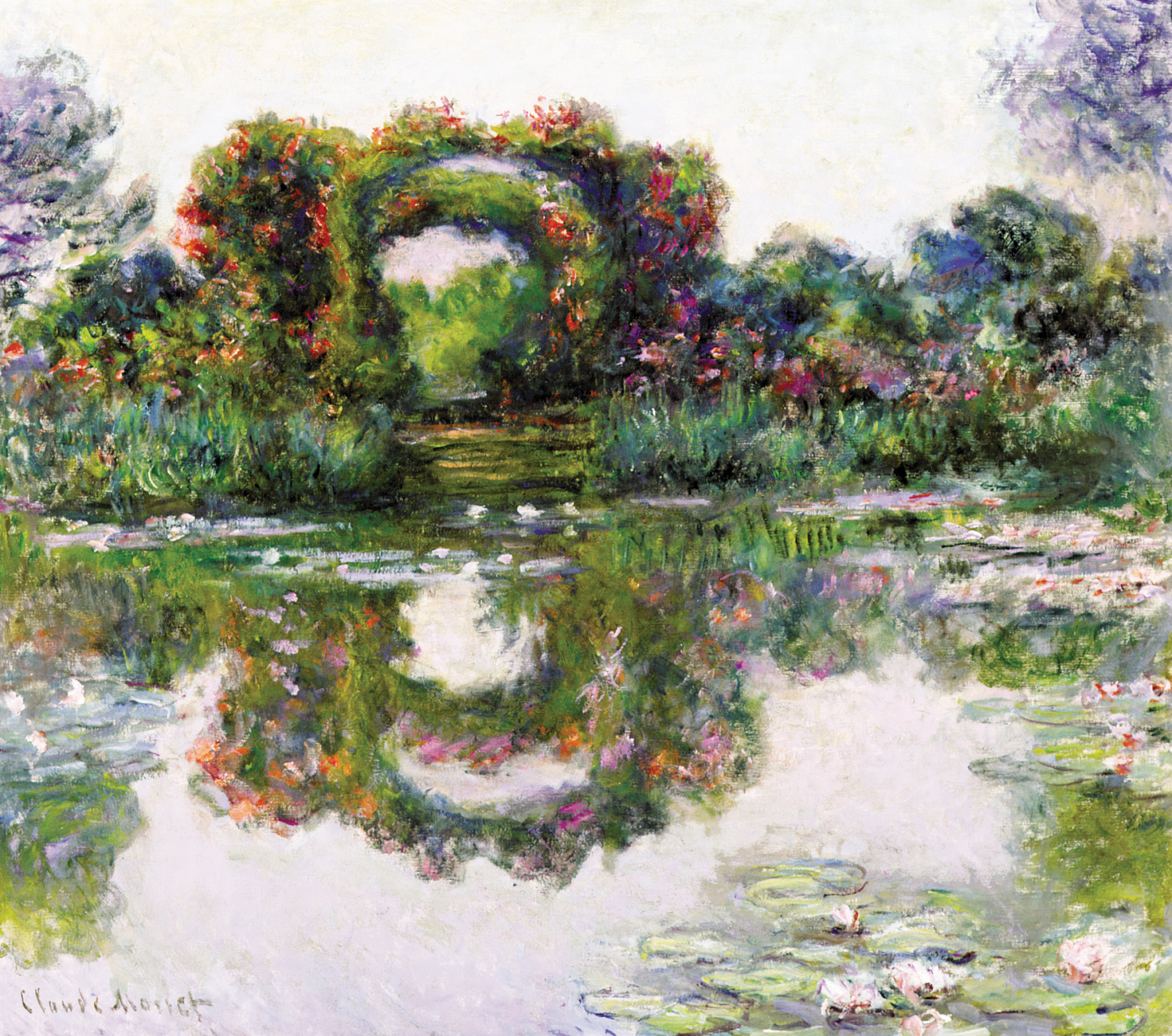
The collection includes Claude Monet's Flowering Arches, Giverny (1913)

The Phoenix Art Museum is the largest museum for visual art in the southwest United States. Located in Phoenix, Arizona, the museum is 285,000 square feet (26,500 m^{2}). It displays international exhibitions alongside its comprehensive collection of more than 18,000 works of American, Asian, European, Latin American, Western American, modern and contemporary art, and fashion design. A community center since 1959, it hosts festivals, live performances, independent art films and educational programs year-round. It also features The Hub: The James K. Ballinger Interactive Gallery, an interactive space for children; photography exhibitions through the museum's partnership with the Center for Creative Photography; the landscaped Sculpture Garden; dining and shopping.

It has been designated a Phoenix Point of Pride.

== History ==
Opened in 1959, the Phoenix Art Museum is located on the Central Avenue Corridor.

Shortly after Arizona became the 48th state in 1912, the Phoenix Women's Club was formed and worked with the Arizona State Fair Committee to develop a fine arts program. In 1915, the club purchased Carl Oscar Borg's painting Egyptian Evening for US$125 and presented it to the city of Phoenix to begin a community art collection. In 1925, the State Fair Committee expanded its community responsibilities and formed the Phoenix Fine Arts Association.

The next major advance in the local art community came during 1936, when the Phoenix Art Center was created under the auspices of the Works Progress Administration's Federal Art Project. Its director was the painter Philip C. Curtis. Its success led to the creation in 1940 of the Civic Center Association, which set about raising funds and planning a building on a 6.5-acre plot donated by the heirs of Adolphus Clay Bartlett. These heirs included Maie Bartlett Heard, who with her husband Dwight B. Heard founded the Heard Museum.

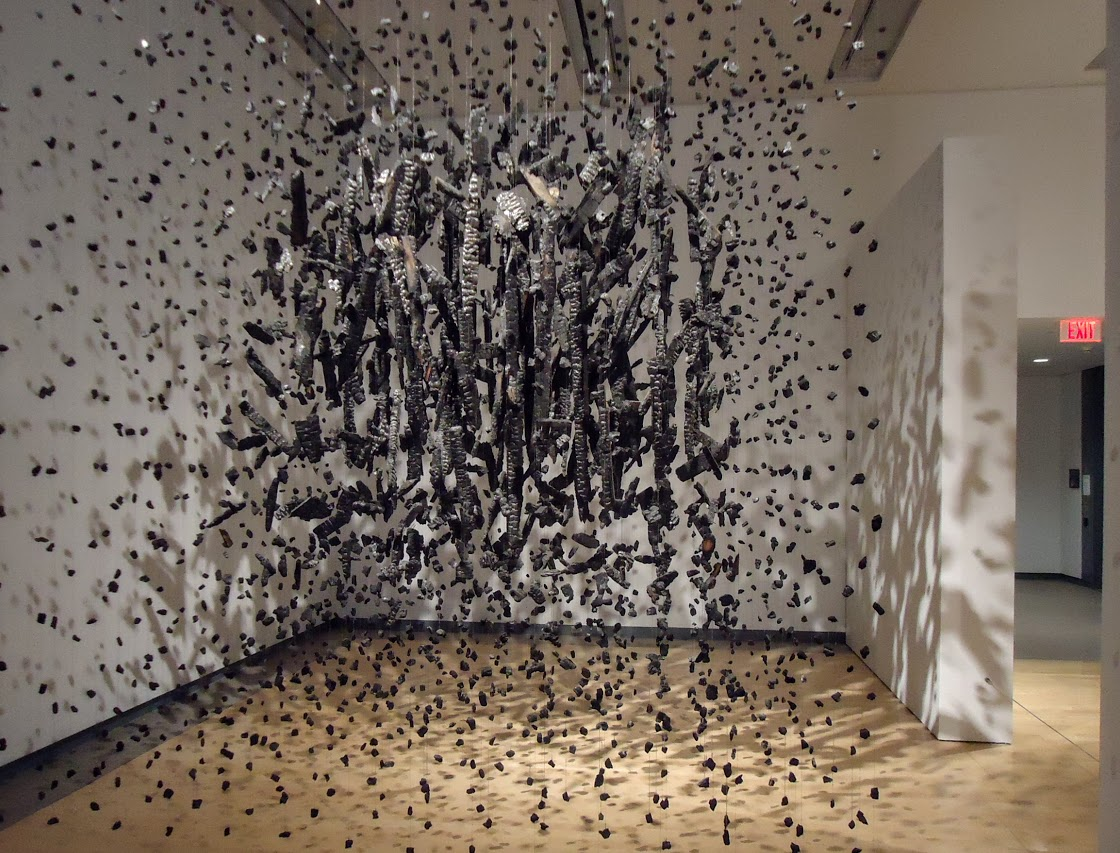
An art exhibit with objects hanging from strings from the ceiling

In the early 1950s, Alden Dow, an architect, was retained by the board of trustees to design a complex that would house the Phoenix Public Library, the Phoenix Little Theater (now the Phoenix Theatre) and the new Phoenix Art Museum. The structural engineering firm chosen for this project was Severud Associates. To coordinate this endeavor, the Phoenix Fine Arts Association named a new board of trustees in 1952 and the museum's first director, Forest M. Hinkhouse, in 1957.

The museum opened on November 18, 1959, and was officially dedicated on November 21, 1959. Two years later, the board announced plans for an expansion, and in 1965 the museum was enlarged from 25,000 square feet (2,300 m^{2}) to 72,000 square feet (6,700 m^{2}). Additional expansions, led by design architects Tod Williams Billie Tsien Architects of New York, occurred in 1996 and 2006. The museum more than doubled its size with new exhibition galleries, a 300-seat public theater, a research library, studio classroom facilities, the PhxArtKids Gallery, and a café. Most recently, in 2006, the museum saw the opening of the Ellen and Howard C. Katz Wing for Modern Art, the Heather and Michael Greenbaum Museum Lobby, an expanded museum store and the 40,000-square-foot (3,700 m^{2}) Bennett and Jacquie Dorrance Sculpture Garden. A new entrance from the north parking includes a cantilevered canopy, creating a large outdoor pavilion area. The museum's growth has been funded, in part, by successful City of Phoenix Bond Elections and a voter-approved bond.

In the last 50 years, the museum has hosted more than 400 exhibitions from all over the world, grown the collection to more than 18,000 works of art, and been visited by millions.

== Collections ==
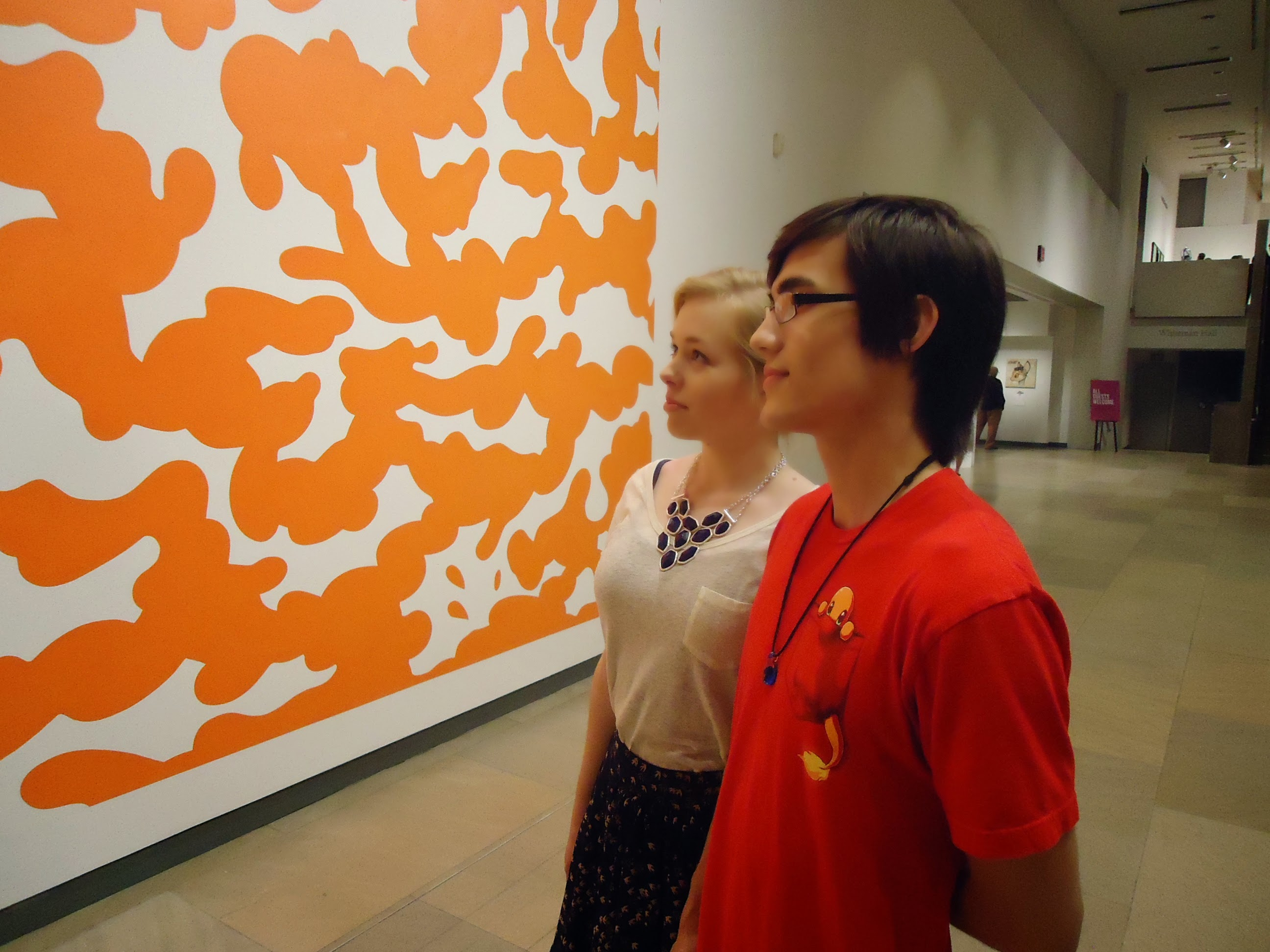
Young couple examining a painting

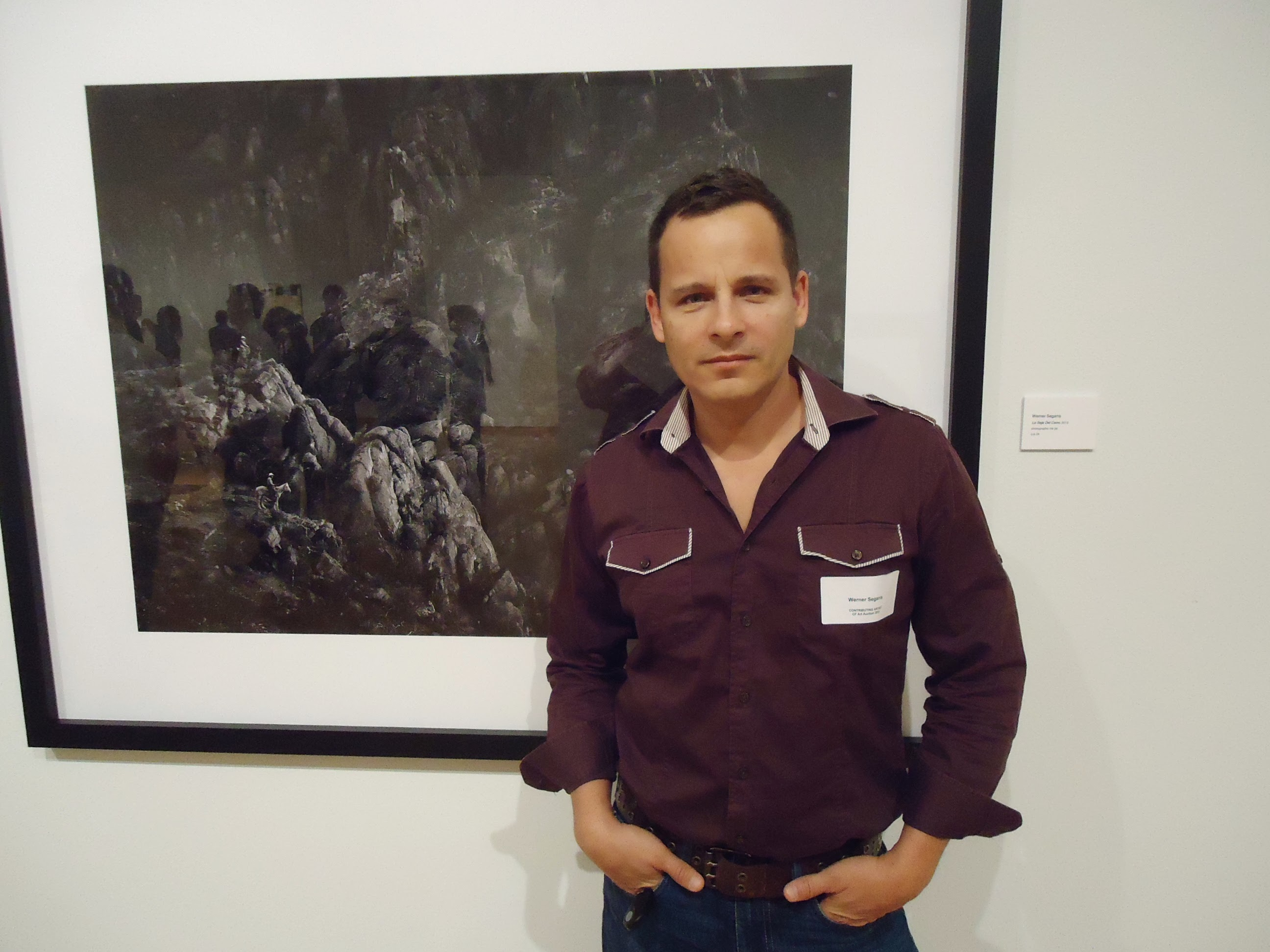
Artist Werner Segarra in front of one of his photographic creations

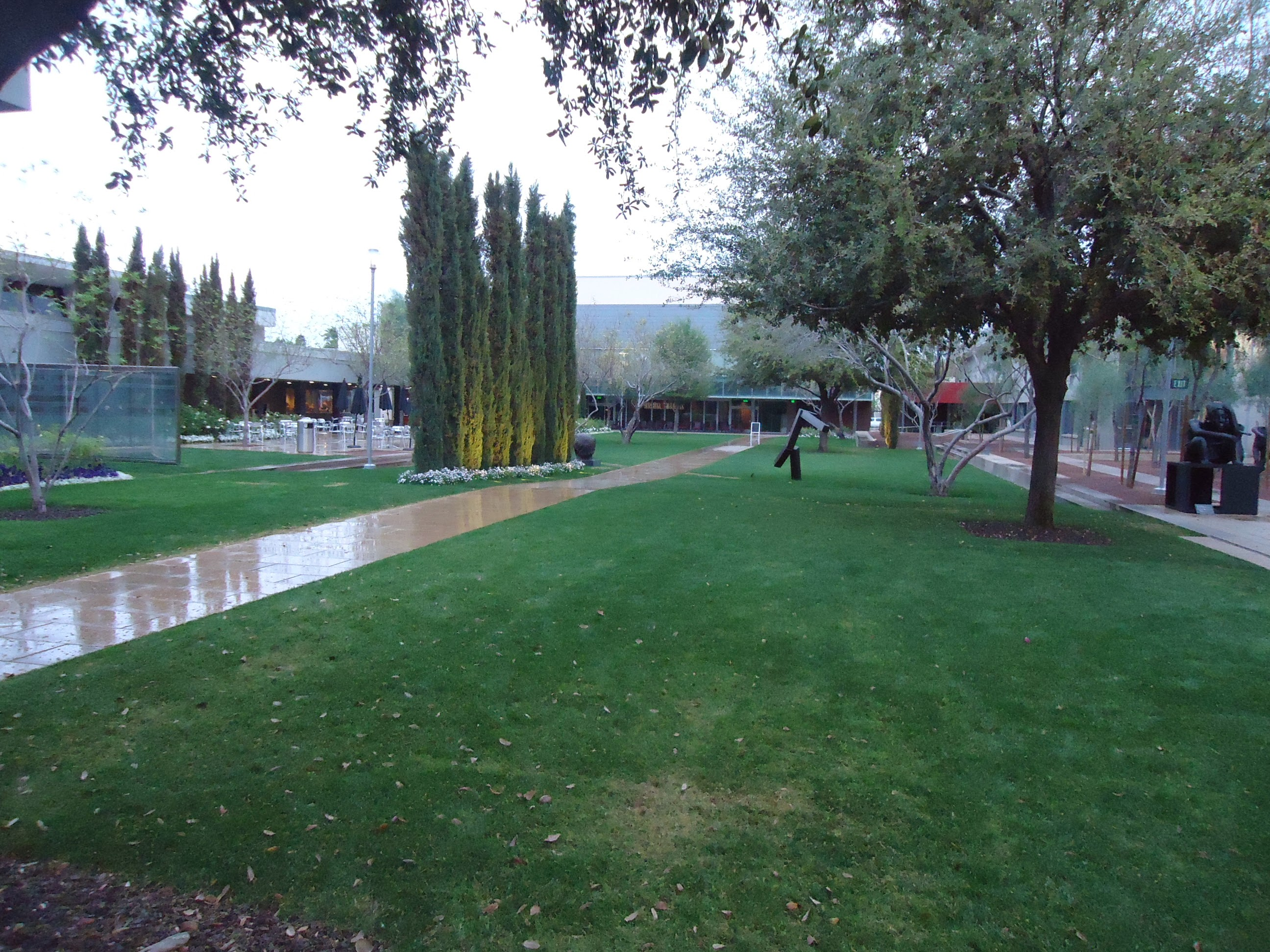
Outdoor sculpture garden

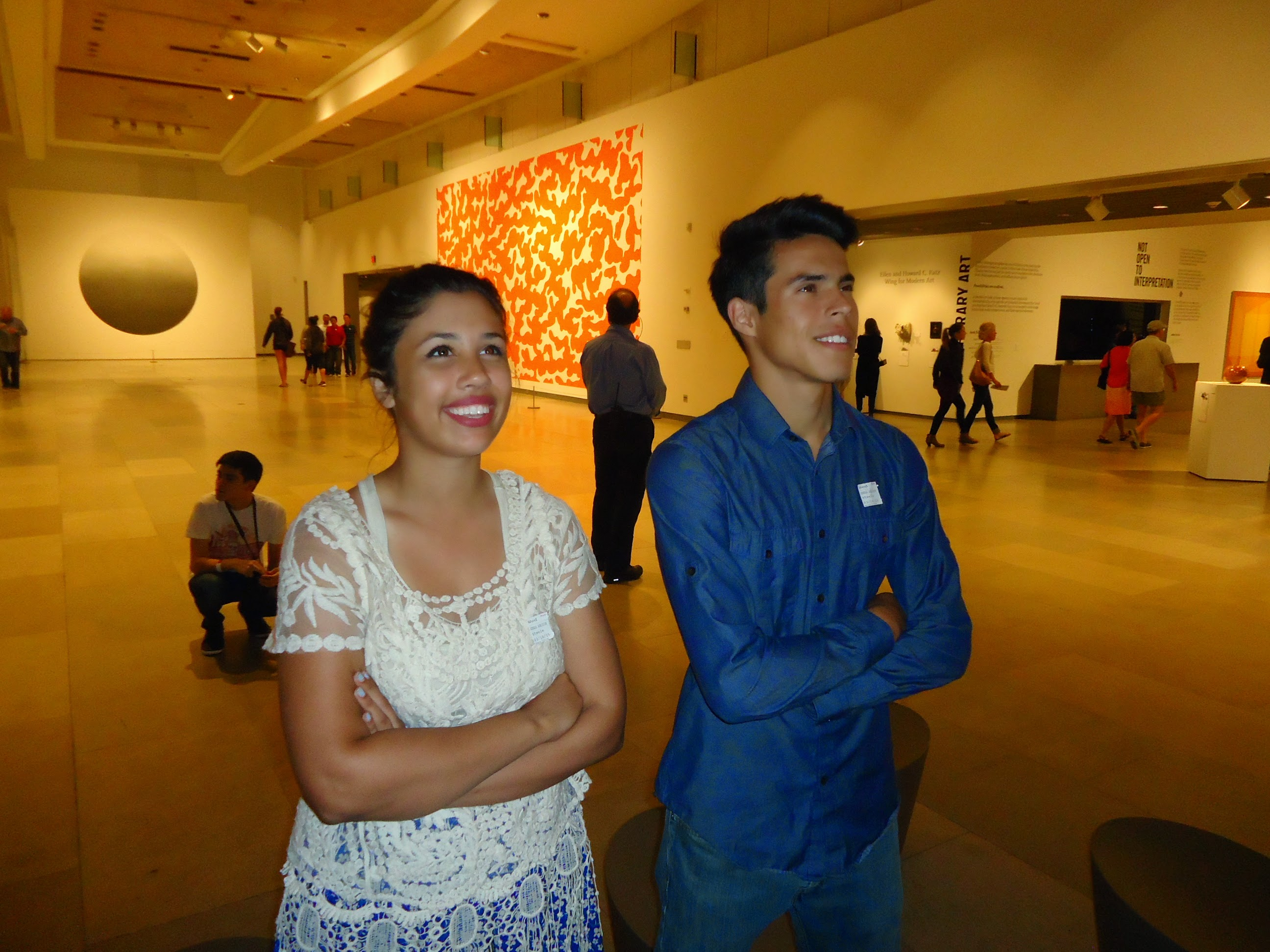
One of the main exhibition rooms

In addition to an annual calendar of exhibitions, the museum's permanent collection galleries are drawn from more than 19,000 works of American, Asian, European, Latin American, Western American, modern and contemporary art, and fashion design. Visitors also enjoy photography exhibitions through the museum's landmark partnership with the Center for Creative Photography, University of Arizona.

The museum has European paintings by Ubertini, Girolamo Genga, Guercino, Carlo Dolci, Bernardo Strozzi, Marcellus Coffermans, Jacob Cornelisz, Master of Astorga, Bartolomeus Bruyn the Elder, Nicolas Lepicie, Giovanni Piazzetta, Elizabeth Vigee-Lebrun, Antoine Vestier, George Romney, Camille Corot, Hippolyte Delpy, Eugène Boudin, Jean-Léon Gérôme (Pollice Verso), Claude Monet (Garden Arches, Giverny), Max Beckmann, Léon Portau, Édouard Vuillard, and Pablo Picasso. It has American paintings by Gilbert Stuart, Sanford Gifford, Robert Henri, Ernest Lawson, Marsden Hartley, Stuart Davis, Georgia O'Keeffe, Jonas Lie, Lew Davis, Ernest Blumenschein, Joseph Sharp, Howard Post, and Ed Mell. It has contemporary art by Yayoi Kusama (You Who Are Getting Obliterated in the Dancing Swarm of Fireflies), Viola Frey, Donald Martiny Kehinde Wiley, Carlos Amorales (Black Cloud), and Helen Frankenthaler. It has 20th Century Sculpture by Aristide Maillol, Max Ernst, Hans Arp, Jacob Epstein, and Giacometti.

== Education ==
The museum offers several educational programs. The museum's Education Division programming is segmented by audience and type of learning strategy to accommodate a range of ages and learning styles, both formal and informal.

The Education Division also facilitates a nationally competitive Internship program. Internships are offered to current undergraduates, graduate students, and recent graduates with requisite coursework, experience, and background. The program is offered year-round and project-based internships are also offered on occasion.

== Lemon Art Research Library ==
The Lemon Art Research Library is a non-circulating research library with an emphasis on the museum's art collection. It contains more than 40,000 books, periodicals, artist files and more. It is the largest specialized fine arts library in the region. It is free of charge during public hours.

== Funding ==
Community support accounts for approximately 80% of the museum's revenue through admissions, membership and earned revenue, which includes the store and facility rentals. Government support of the museum is approximately 3% of the budget; corporate contributions constitute approximately 10% of the budget. The museum's endowment contributes the remainder, approximately 7%.

== Gallery ==
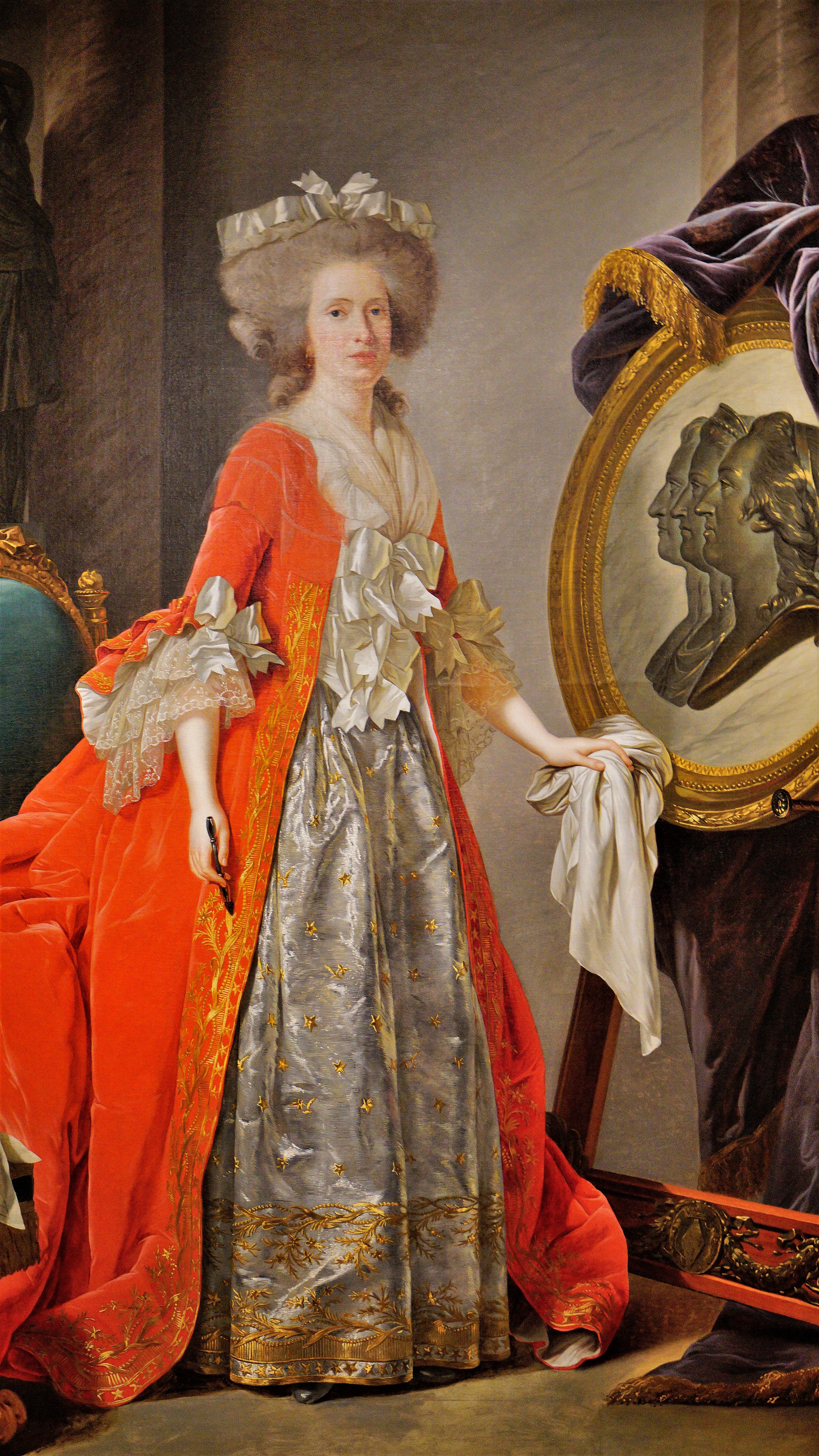
Adelaide Labille-Guiard, Madame Adelaide, 1791

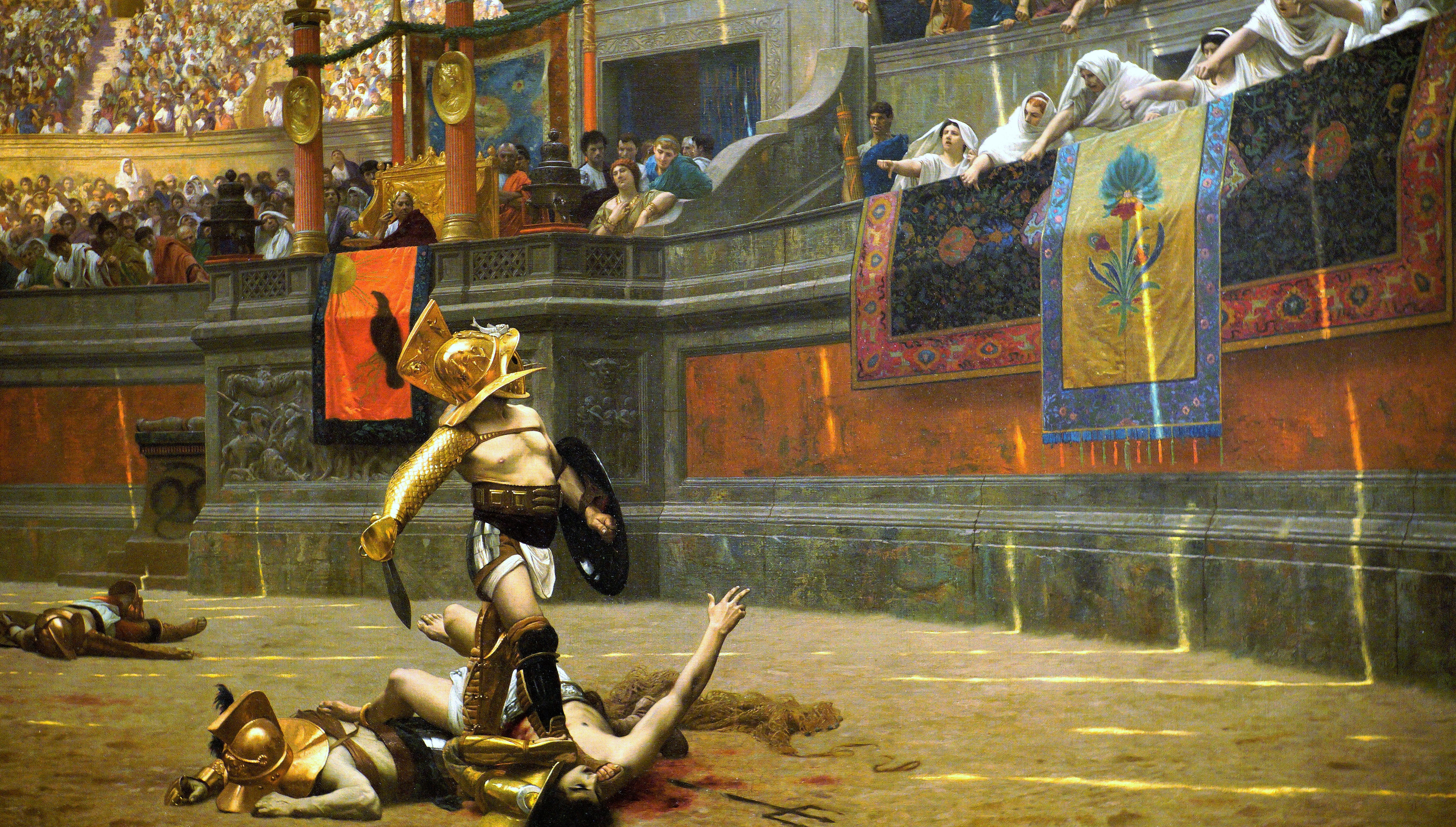
Jean-Léon Gérôme, Pollice Verso, 1872

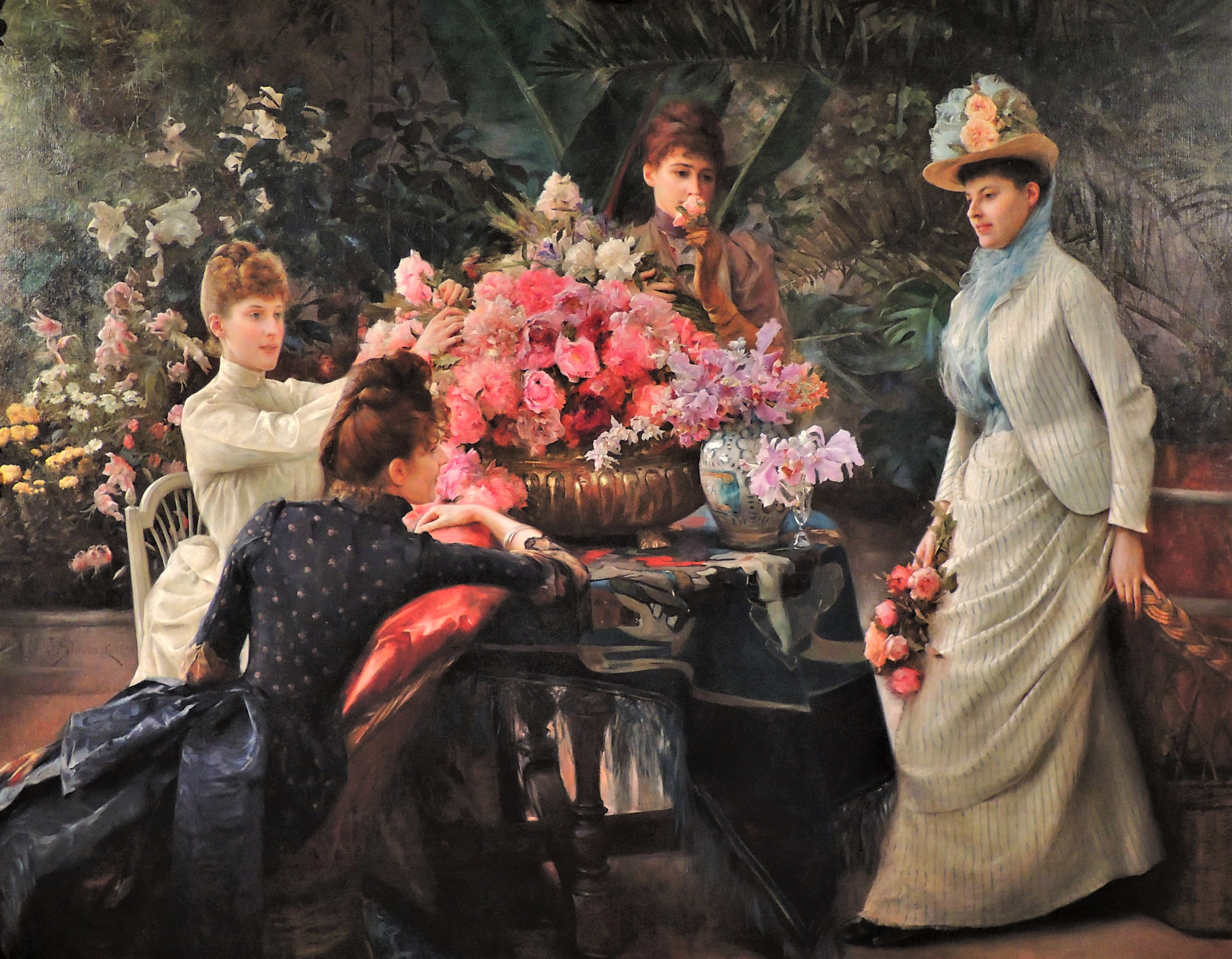
Julius LeBlanc Stewart, Spring Flowers, 1890

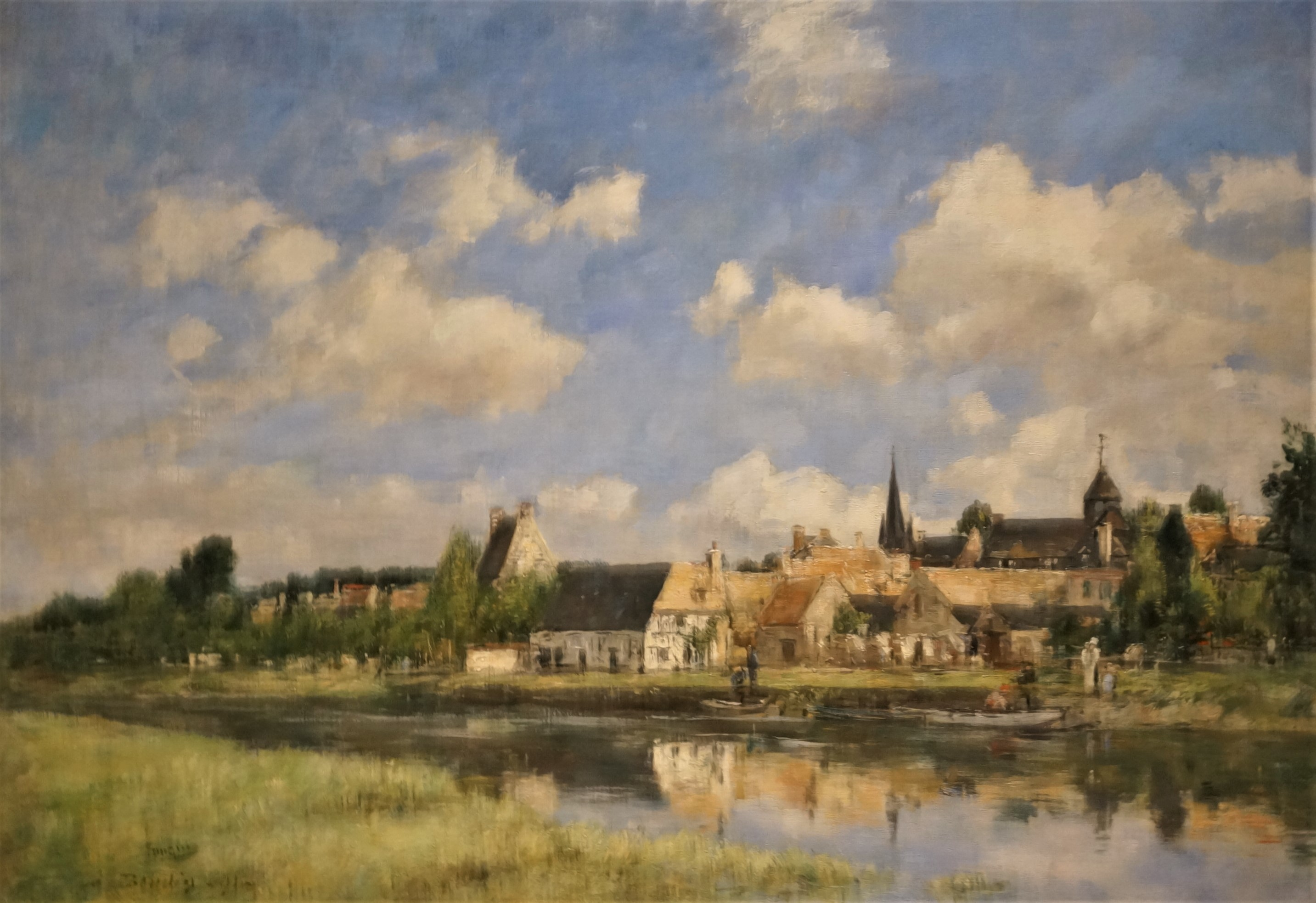
Eugene Boudin, The Old Harbor at Touques, 1891

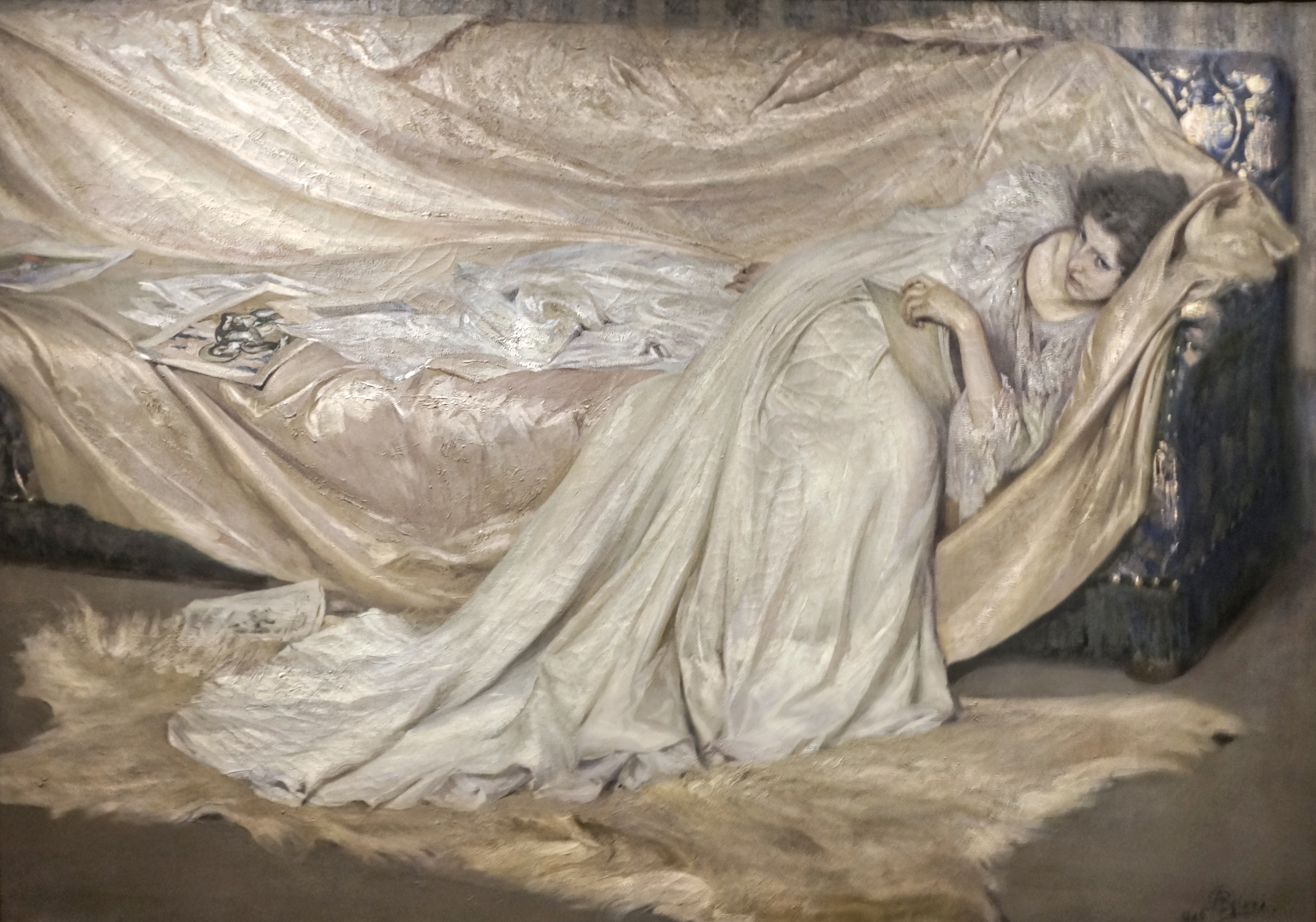
Antonio Rizzi, Study in White, 1896

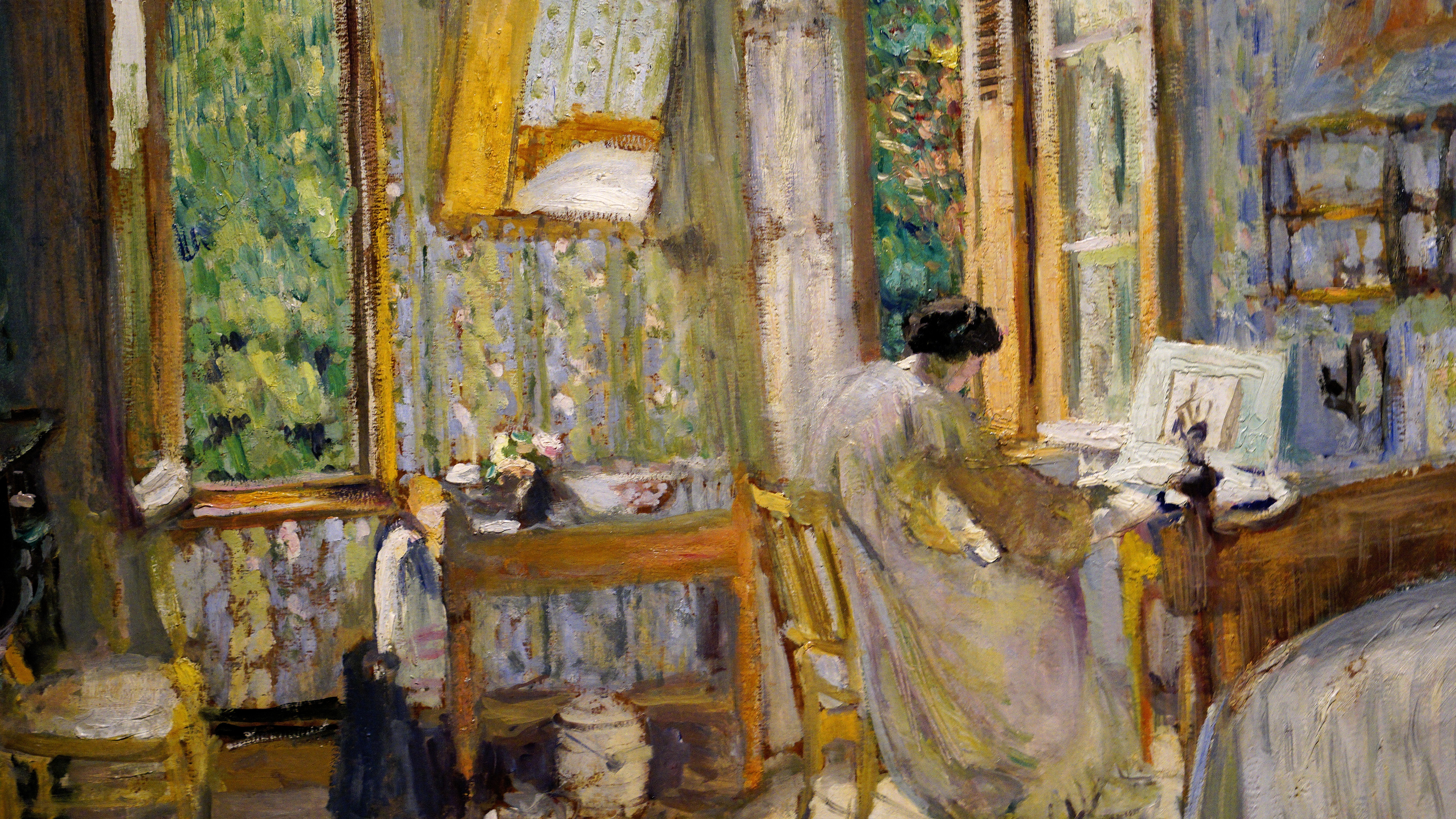
Edouard Vuillard, Madame Hessel Working at a Dressmaker's Table, 1908

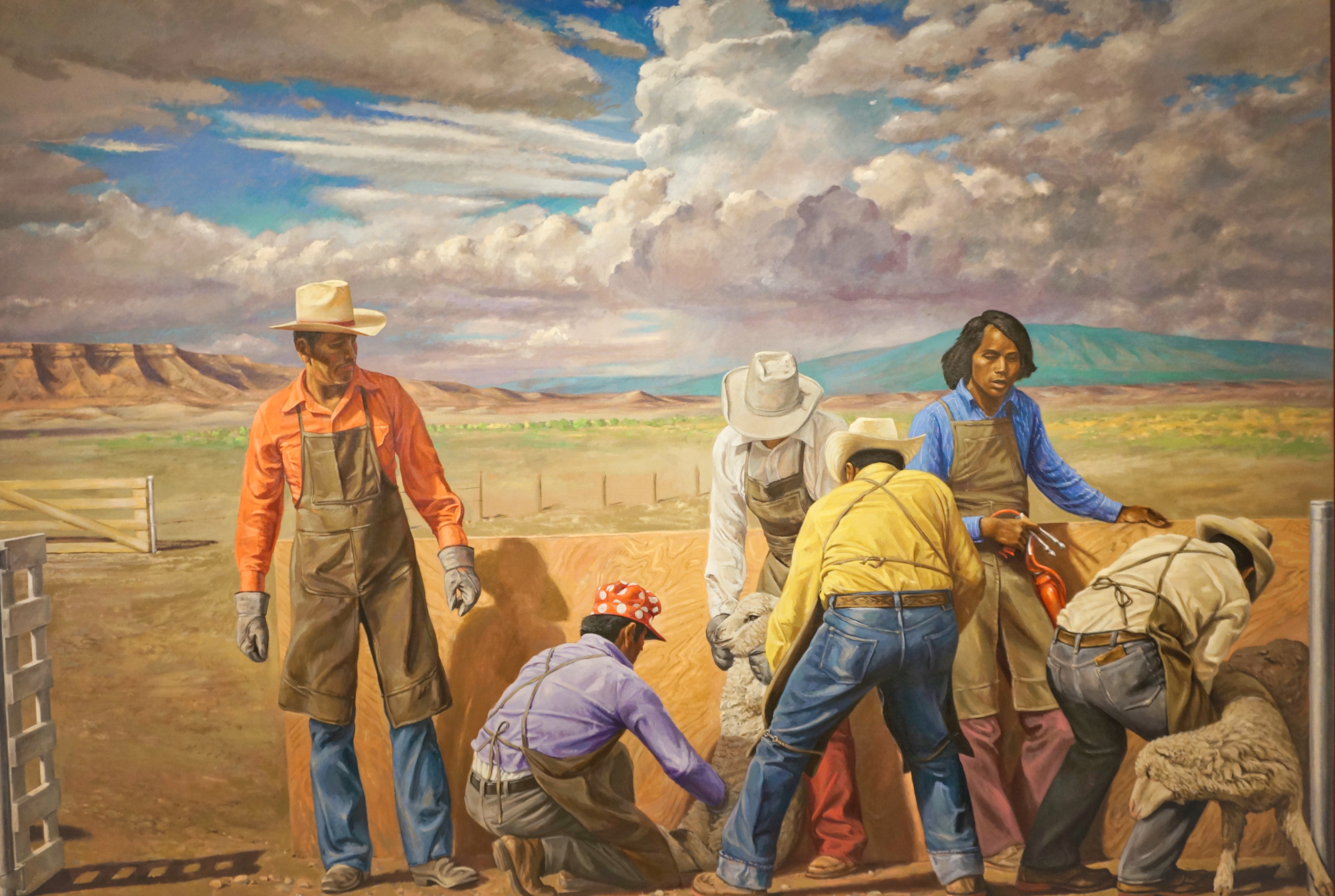
Willard Franklin Midgette, Processing Sheep, 1976

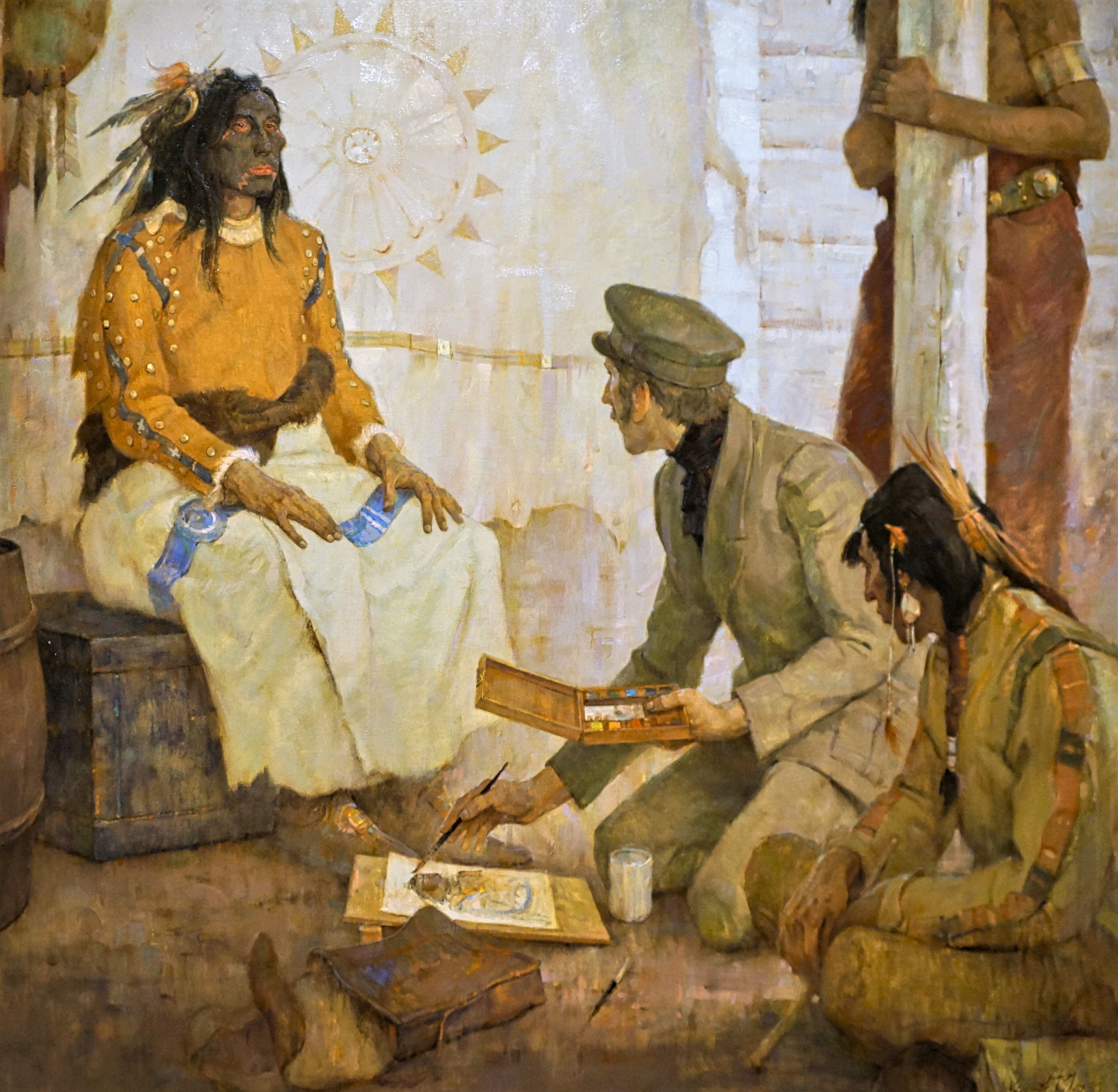
Kenneth Riley, Bodmer Painting Piegan Chief, 1986

== See also ==
- List of historic properties in Phoenix, Arizona
