= Le vieillard (Pourtau) =

Painting by Léon Pourtau

The old man
- Le vieillard (French)
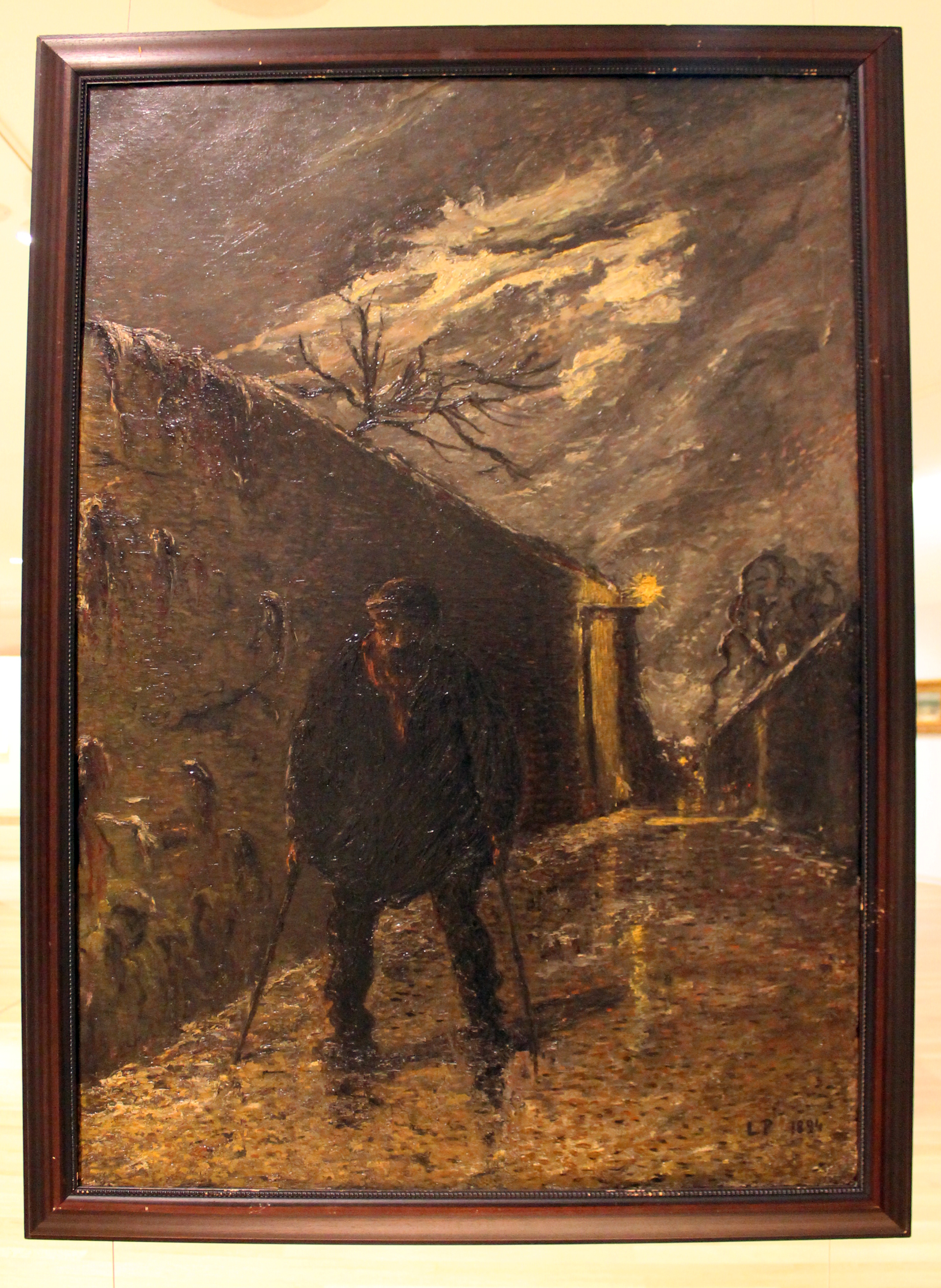
- Artist: Léon Pourtau
- Year: 1894
- Medium: Oil on canvas
- Dimensions: 116.1 cm × 81 cm (45.7 in × 32 in)
- Location: Museo Soumaya, Mexico City

Le vieillard (The old man) is an 1894 painting by Léon Pourtau in the collection of the Museo Soumaya, Mexico City.

This work represents an old man in a deserted French street, during a curfew of Prussian occupation. The man walks with crutches, probably with a physical wound. The scene is illuminated by the explosion of a bomb that produces an intense yellow colour that breaks the darkness of the night.

This work was produced in the context of the defeat of the French Republic to the German Empire after the Franco-Prussian War. Pourtau was a student of Georges Seurat and this work shows influence of pointillism and divisionism. The technique employed by Pourtau to achieve a contrast between the dark and the distinct colours in the work is impasto oil painting, which involves applying thick layers of paint. It is close in style to German Expressionism.

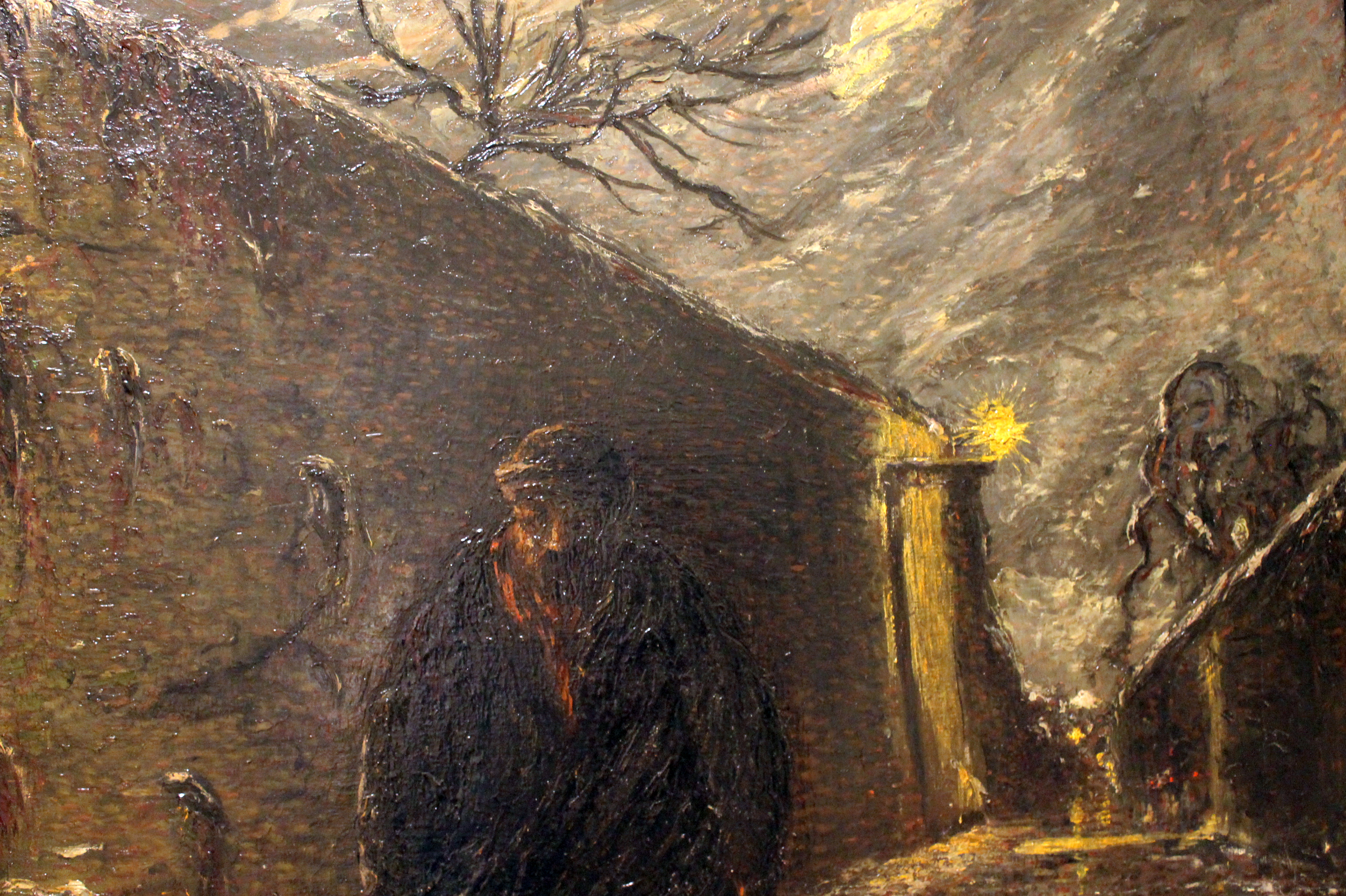
Detail

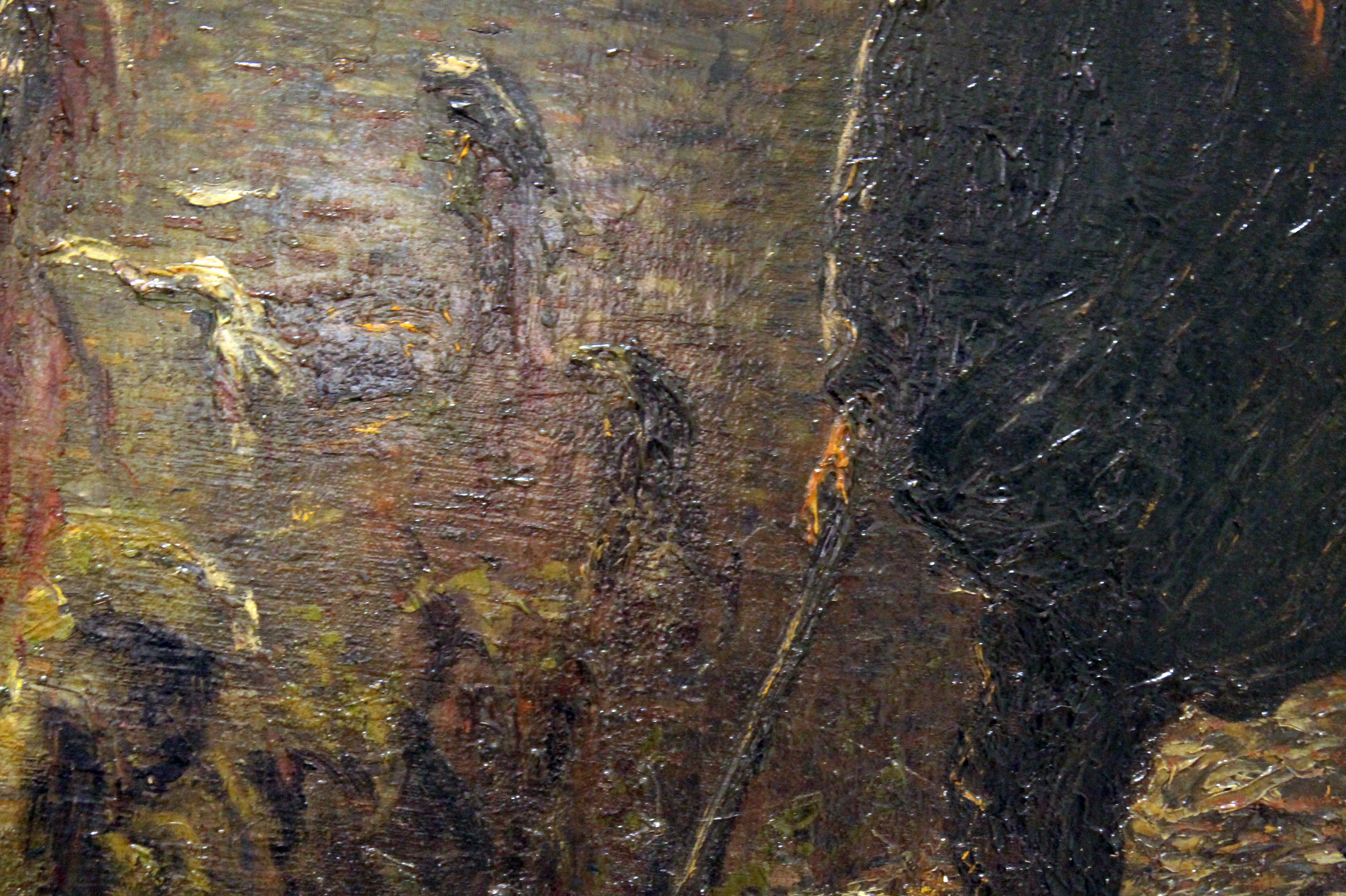
Detall
