= Léon Pourtau =

French painter and musician

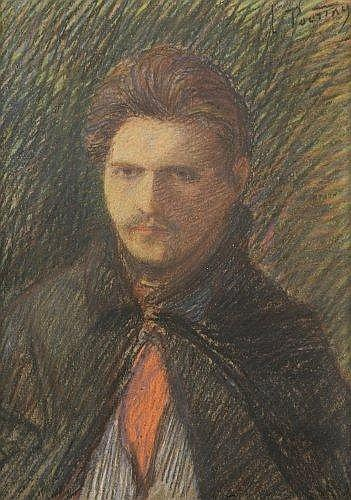
- Self-portrait c. 1890
- Born: 23 November 1868; Bordeaux, France
- Died: 4 July 1898; Atlantic Ocean, near Sable Island, Canada
- Movement: Post-Impressionism, pointillism, Divisionism

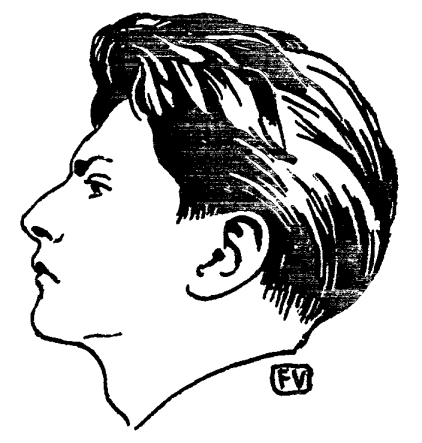
Léon Pourtau. (Portrait by Félix Vallotton)

Léon Pourtau (23 November 1868 – 4 July 1898) was a French painter and musician.

At the age of 15, an apprentice typesetter, Pourtau left Bordeaux for Paris. He worked in a small restaurant on the Rue Lafayette, where musicians gathered Orchestre Lamoureux. Thanks to them Pourtau got a job as a concert clarinetist in a Café-chantant. He toured with a circus band where he would help set up the tent and bathe the elephants. Back in Paris he entered the Conservatoire de Paris. During this period he married, had two children, and become a professor at the Conservatoire de Lyon at the age of 22 – the youngest ever.

He met Georges Seurat, himself also a musician, who taught him the impressionist technique. He took the opportunity of a concert tour in the US, which, after two years, earned him 20,000 Francs. He also became principal clarinetist of the Boston Symphony Orchestra in 1894 at the invitation of conductor Emil Paur. At the annual exhibition of fine art held in Philadelphia over the winter of 1896–1897, he exhibited a painting, Quatre heures de l'après-midi (Four o'clock in the afternoon). This would be his only showing.

On 2 July 1898 Pourtau boarded the ocean liner La Bourgogne to return to Le Havre. On 4 July she was sunk by a collision in fog with the British sailing ship Cromartyshire off Cape Sable Island. The painter died in the collision.

His works are now in the collections of several art museums including the Museo Soumaya, Mexico City and the Phoenix Art Museum, Phoenix, Arizona.

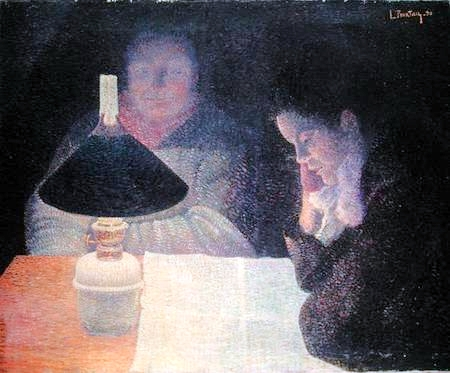
Lecture sous la lampe

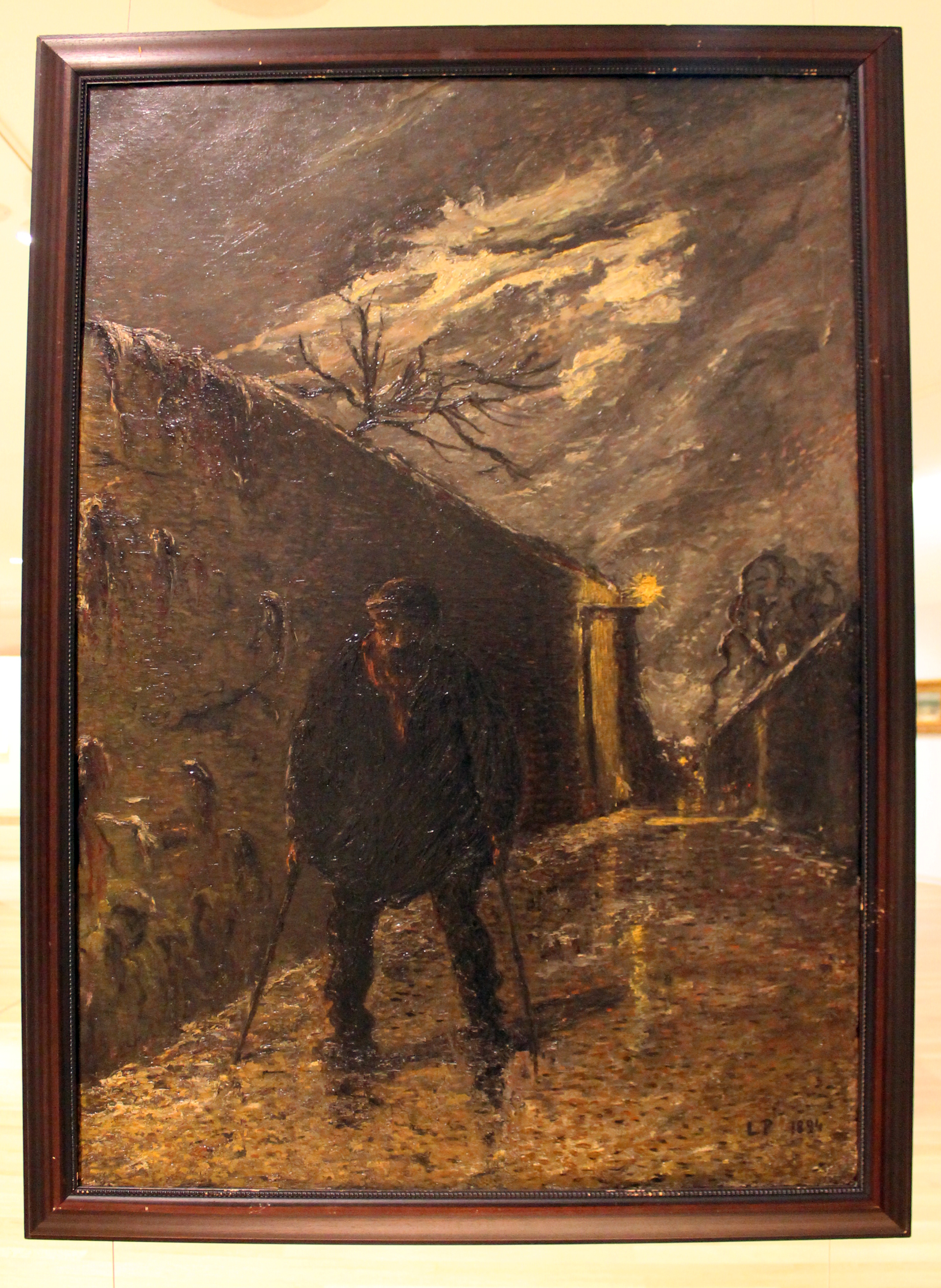
Le vieillard

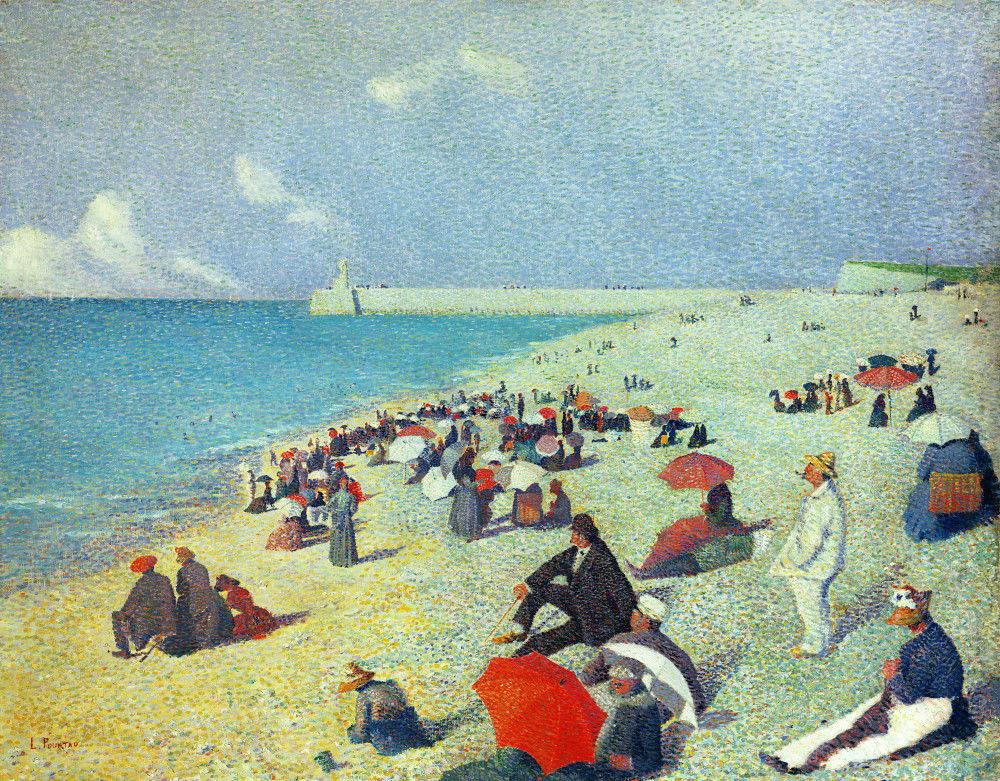
Sur la plage
cf. A Sunday Afternoon on the Island of La Grande Jatte by Seurat

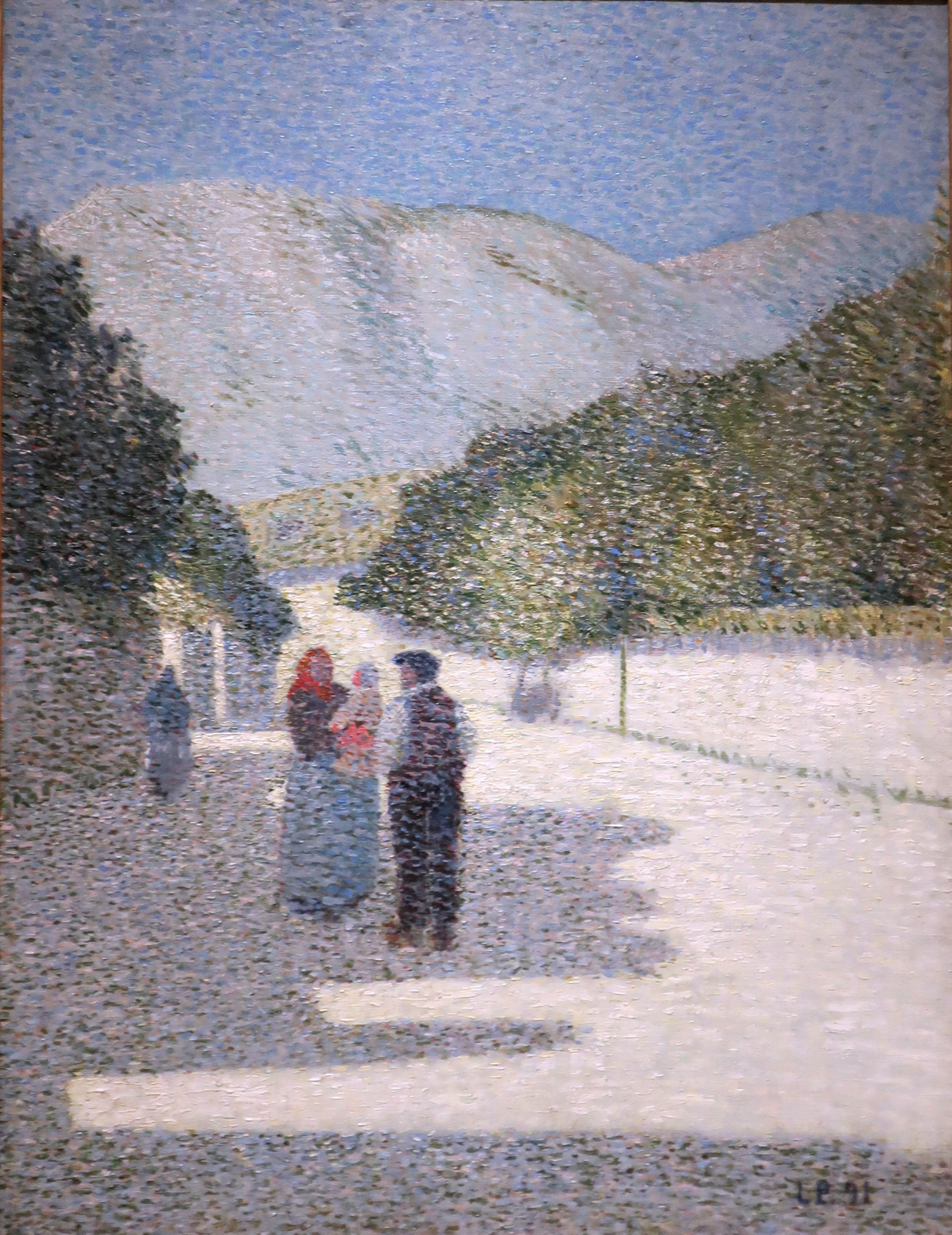
Paysage provençal

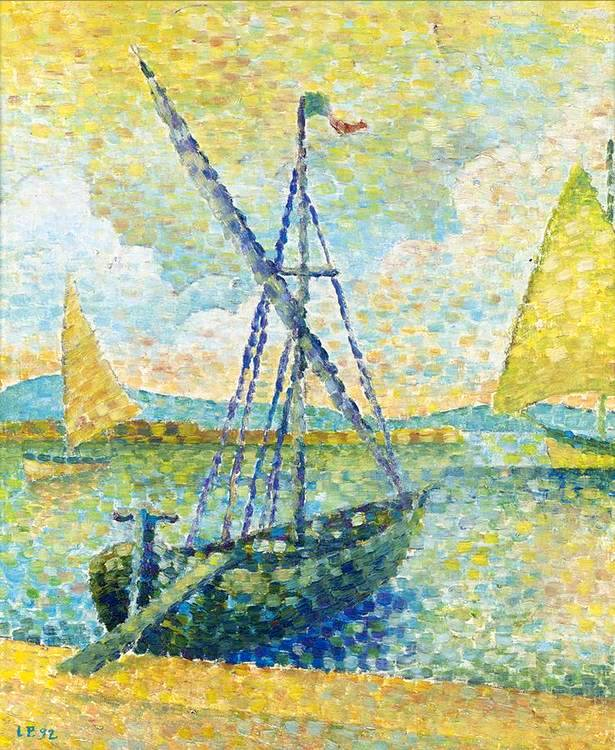
St. Tropez

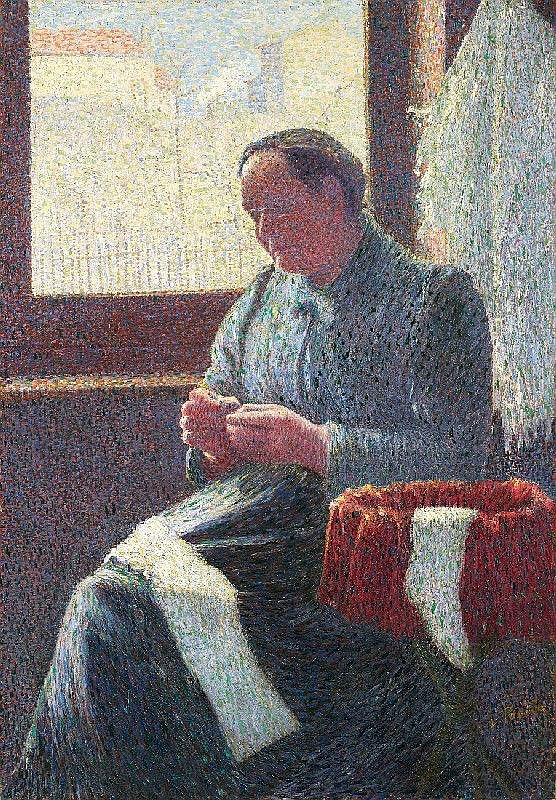
Portrait de madame Vallad

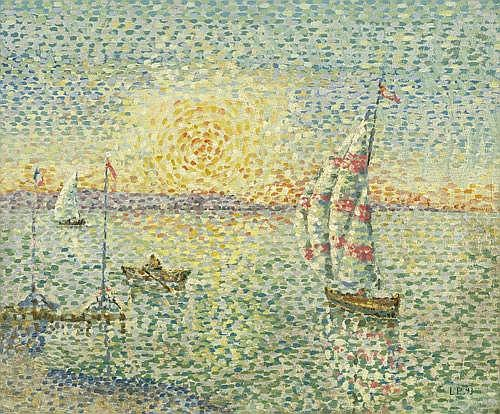
Solei Couchant

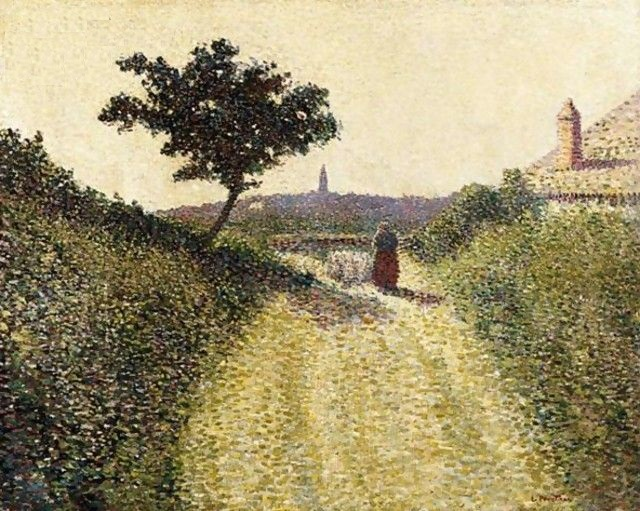
Rue de Village
