= Ed Mell =

American painter (1942-2024)

Ed Mell (1942-2024) was an American painter from Phoenix, Arizona. He specialized in depictions of landscapes of the Southwestern United States, including the Grand Canyon and Monument Valley. His paintings are in the collections of many museums, including the Denver Art Museum, the Phoenix Art Museum, the Scottsdale Museum of Contemporary Art, the Tacoma Art Museum, and the University of Arizona Museum of Art.
