= Barbara Rogers (artist) =

American artist (b. 1937)

- Born: Barbara Joanne Wilson; 1937 (age 88–89); Newcomerstown, Ohio, United States
- Education: Timken Vocational High School; Ohio State University; California School of Fine Arts; University of California, Berkeley
- Known for: Abstract painting, figurative
- Movement: Abstract expressionism, figurative
- Awards: Eisner Prize in Painting. 1963; Richard Florsheim Art Fund Grant, 1999; Lifetime Achievement Award, University of Arizona Museum of Art, 2015

Barbara Rogers (b. 1937) is an American painter and art educator associated with mid-twentieth-century Photorealism and nature-inspired abstraction, and a retired professor of painting at the University of Arizona. She has worked in the media of encaustic, oil, acrylic, printmaking, photography, and collage. Rogers expresses themes about nature and the garden as a personal and symbolic Eden.

== Life, education and influences ==
Barbara Rogers was born Barbara Joanne Wilson in 1937 in the small farming community of Newcomerstown, in northeastern Ohio. Her parents were Willis Adrian Wilson and Ethel Elizabeth Wilson. Her father worked in the machine industry, servicing and repairing Seeburg and Wurlitzer jukeboxes, slot machines, and cigarette and pinball machines. Her stylish mother designed and sewed clothes when Rogers was young, eventually opening Ethel Wilson's Fashions, a high-end women's fashions chain of stores. While her parents worked, Rogers was raised by her extended family of aunts, uncles, and grandparents. In rural Ohio, she learned about the symbiotic relationship between humankind and nature. Through her talented and industrious family, she learned about tools, skills, surviving, and prospering. Her great-uncle, Willis Adrian Tshudy, was a draftsman, carpenter, and pattern maker for a local machine manufacturing company. He taught her how to create and use hand-cut stencils, and her father taught her how to use an airbrush; both later became important techniques in her art. As a child, Rogers spent evenings listening to the radio while the women in the family worked on various handicraft projects, including quilts, braided rugs, and embroidery. Once her chores were done, she was given paper and pencils, which instilled a lifelong passion for drawing.

In 1943, Rogers and her family, including her sister Carol (born 1939), moved to Canton, Ohio, where Rogers attended West North Elementary School from the first through eighth grade. She then attended Timken Vocational High School, where she majored in commercial art. In 1955, she moved to Columbus, Ohio, to attend Ohio State University (OSU) as an art major, living with her aunt and uncle. Texas sculptor and visiting artist Margaret Adelle Stites became one of her earliest influences. In 1957, she took her first drawing class at OSU with Hoyt L. Sherman, who introduced her to kinesthetic drawing and “drawing by seeing” and became another important influence. Her professors, Manuel Barkan and Hoyt Sherman, were also important influences. On an art education field trip to Pittsburgh to see the Carnegie International exhibition, she encountered Willem de Kooning’s Montauk Highway (1958), and it reinforced her desire to become a painter. She graduated from OSU in 1958 with a Bachelor of Arts degree.

=== San Francisco Bay Area, 1960–1963 ===
In 1960, the day Rogers graduated from OSU, she married Alan Thomas Rogers, a fellow art student. Together, they traveled west to San Francisco, where Rogers took painting classes at the California School of Fine Arts (later, the San Francisco Art Institute). Her teachers included Frank Lobdell, Richard Diebenkorn, and Elmer Bischoff, and she also became friends with classmate Carlos Villa. The current movement, Abstract Expressionism, and its focus on maleness both impressed and frustrated Rogers. To her instructors, Abstract Expressionism was a masculine endeavor because the gesture had to show boldness of force and have a sense of power and conviction. While such instruction gave Rogers artistic confidence, it also made her avoid subject matter and abstract gestures that could be considered feminine. To make a living as an artist, she had to define her art on her own terms and challenge the male-dominated system.

Facing adversity as one of the few women artists exhibiting in San Francisco art galleries, Rogers relied on professional friendships with other highly respected, yet marginalized Bay Area artists, including Raymond Saunders (artist). Robert Colescott, George Miyasaki, and Carlos Villa. Soon, however, Abstract Expressionism was giving way to the Bay Area Figurative movement, which fueled heated debate within art criticism and sparked a renewed interest in realism throughout the United States and beyond. In San Francisco, she developed her own photorealistic style that placed the figure in a utopian setting of tropical foliage, resonating with allegorical content. In 1961, Rogers was accepted into the graduate painting program of the University of California, Berkeley. Felix Ruvolo, her next-door neighbor on Hearst Street, was one of her influential professors, and ceramicist Jim Melchert and his wife, Mary Ann Melchert, lived across the street. Rogers studied art history with Herschel Chipp, printmaking with Karl Kasten, and drawing and painting with Erle Loran, Glenn Wessels, John Haley, and visiting artists Michael Goldberg (painter) and Angelo Ippolito.

From 1962 to 1963, Rogers taught art classes at Congregation Emanu-El, commuting by motorcycle with her husband Alan. There, she became interested in Judaism and its concept of choosing one's paradise on earth, which informed her life choices thereafter. During that time, she took a life-drawing class at California College of Arts and Crafts with Nathan Oliviera. She graduated in 1963 with a Master of Arts in Painting from UC Berkeley, where she was awarded the Eisner Prize in Painting. At the award ceremony, the dean told her that she would not get a teaching job because women would not be teaching college-level art in their lifetimes and told her to get good at selling her paintings instead.

=== New York City, 1963–1965 ===
Using her Eisner Prize money, in 1963, Rogers and her husband traveled to New York City for the first time. She was hired as an art instructor at the Northport Public Schools on Long Island, and her husband was hired at Columbia University. They rented a house in Northport, one house away from novelist and poet Jack Kerouac and his mother. They also spent weekends visiting art museums in Manhattan, staying at the Chelsea Hotel, where she encountered Salvador Dalí and Arthur Miller. i She was also invited with her friend Priscilla Birge to tea by Bay Area art critic and art history professor Alfred Frankenstein, who was staying in the penthouse apartment with composer Virgil Thomson.

=== San Francisco Bay Area, 1965-1989 ===
In 1965, Rogers and her husband returned to California, where she accepted a position as an adjunct art lecturer in beginning drawing at UC Berkeley. The following year, her work was included in the Painting and Drawing Annual at the Richmond Art Center, and the Associate Faculty Exhibition at the Worth Rider Gallery, UC Berkeley. In 1967, she met Michael Walls, who was a student in one of her classes. A year later, he left the university to open a gallery in San Francisco and presented Rogers's first solo exhibition. During this time, Rogers began working with acrylic paints and the airbrush, a motorized tool used in commercial art that was gaining popularity with the rise of Photorealism and Pop Art. She reintroduced the figure in her paintings, already begun in her drawings.

In 1969, she and her husband Alan adopted a son, Christopher. The same year, she had a second solo show at Michael Walls Gallery. For the next two years, she spent her time being a mother, homemaker, and artist, while preparing for her first museum exhibition. At that time, the San Francisco Bay Area was a hotbed of protests, violence, and riots. As a result, Rogers shifted her subject matter to images of the garden as a metaphorical place of control and serenity for her family. According to University of Arizoan professor Paul Eli Ivey, "Rogers abandoned herself in her garden imagery but was always in careful control over it. Her garden was Carl Jung’s jungle, a space for the unconscious to construct dream imagery, where a different set of laws operated.” She then created works featuring surreal images of composite beings in lush, jungle settings with glamorous figures, unlike other photorealists of the time, who focused on everyday life. Her main models, Renée and Nehemiah, represented a glamorous, liberated life of romance and exoticism.

In 1973, the San Francisco Art Institute Artist Committee, a group that represented the views and interests of Bay Area artists, invited Rogers to join the group. She was then appointed, along with Carlos Villa and Howard Fried, to select the recipient of the San Francisco Art Institute Adaline Kent Award for a promising California artist, which included a one-person exhibition and a catalogue. The committee chose Joan Broan, the first time that a woman had ever been selected for the award.

Also in 1973, the San Francisco Museum of Modern Art presented a solo exhibition of Rogers's paintings, curated by Suzanne Foley. In these paintings, she arranged colorful birds, props, nudes, and costumed people in artificial jungle settings. Among her cast of characters and images were voyeuristic clowns; glamorous, jeweled females in broad-brimmed hats and turbans; handsome, top-hatted magicians; lush orchids; and tropical foliage, both real and imagined. Writer Charles Shere considered her work “strong and beautiful,” and that Rogers’ work showed how “wit and clarity can redeem the clichés of the psychedelic visionary realists, and how vision and intelligence can redeem those of the New Realists.” The Santa Barbara Museum of Art also included Rogers in Twelve Painters of the Human Figure, curated by Paul Mills. A screen was placed in front of her painting, Three Nudes and a Samurai Bowsman (1972), warning parents that the painting contained male frontal nudity.

Rogers became a visiting faculty member in painting at the San Francisco Art Institute in 1974. That year, A. James Speyer, the curator of twentieth-century painting and sculpture at the Art Institute of Chicago, invited Rogers to participate in the Seventy-First American Exhibition. During the opening reception, she met painter Deborah Remington, and they became friends, and Remington as her mentor. Also in 1974, Rogers was included in Contemporary American Painting and Sculpture: An Exhibition, at the Krannert Art Museum, curated by James R. Shipley. The following year, Rogers and her husband Alan sublet their apartment in Oakland and moved to Inverness, California, in Marin County. She rented a studio space from sculptor Theodore Odza and shortly after, she took a visiting faculty appointment at the School of Art, University of Washington. That year, the San Francisco Museum of Modern Art purchased her painting, Nehemiah and Renée with Orchid (1975). She was also given another solo show at the Michael Walls Gallery, now at his new space in New York City, and her work was included in Images of Woman at the Linda Farris Gallery in Seattle.

In 1976, Rogers and her husband moved back to Oakland and then filed for a formal separation. The following year, she purchased the home they had been renting in Oakland, and she took a visiting art faculty position at Contra Costa College in El Sobrante, California, where she taught painting and drawing classes. Elected to the board of trustees as a member of the Artists Committee at the San Francisco Art Institute, the group organized the first large-scale art exhibition at San Francisco's Fort Mason, part of the San Francisco Art Institute Annual, Mavericks and Misfits. She also had a solo exhibition at Hanson Fuller Goldeen Gallery in San Francisco. Rogers took her first trip to visit museums and major European cities with her mother and a group of friends. Upon her return, she taught as a visiting faculty member at San Jose State University School of Art (SJSU) and opened a solo exhibition at Michael Berger Gallery in Pittsburgh. Her divorce from Alan Rogers was made official in 1979.

Rogers was hired as a lecturer at San Jose State University School of Art in 1980. That year, she participated in Photo-Realist Painting in California: A Survey at Santa Barbara Museum of Art, curated by William Spurlock, and Neo-Romanticism of the Eighties at Gallery Yves Arman in New York City, as well as a solo exhibition at Marianne Deson Gallery in Chicago. In 1981, she was invited to create a suite of seven thirteen-plate lithographs at Magnolia Editions in Oakland, and her work was included in Forty Famous Californians, curated by Michael Wals for Judith Christian Gallery in New York.

Rogers continued to lecture at SJSU, teaching a graduate seminar and airbrush painting classes. She also curated the exhibition and produced the catalogue for The Artist and the Airbrush at what is now the Natalie and James Thompson Art Gallery at SJSU. In 1982, while on a photo shoot to Oahu, Hawaii, Rogers experienced powerful Hurricane Iwa, an event that destroyed lives, homes, and businesses. After seeing the ravaged jungles, beaches, and gardens, she was profoundly affected by the destructive forces of nature. She stopped painting themes of lush, peaceful paradises and began to explore elements from nature used in architectural design. She embraced such themes because they depended on composition and order rather than the chaos she witnessed during the storm. She then began studying the history of ornament and its relationship to natural forms. Over time, ready to tackle the emotionally charged subject of the hurricane, she replaced the airbrush with traditional brushes and acrylic paint. Focusing on the details of natural forms such as plants, shells, and invertebrates, she began a series of works that express the sensations associated with the storm's terrifying force. She would return to Hawaii several times over the next few years to photograph and gather information.

The following year, in 1983, she joined the painting faculty of the San Francisco Art Institute and soon after became the new chair of the painting faculty. In 1984, her lithograph, Renée with a Blue-Headed Macaw (1984), was selected for the American Cultural Centers in Islamabad and Lahore, Pakistan, and in Brussels, Belgium. She was also elected chair of the graduate program at the San Francisco Art Institute. In 1985, Rogers visited Arizona for the first time, serving as an evaluator for a Getty Center for Education in the Arts symposium held in Scottsdale. That year, the Carnegie Museum of Art in Pittsburgh featured her work in Flowers on a Grand Scale, and the Fresno Museum of Art, California, included her work in In the Advent of Change. The following year, she traveled to the Dominican Republic with the Artist Advisory Committee for Grumbacher Paint Company.

New developments in Rogers's work occurred in 1987 when she replaced acrylic paints with oils. Later, she collaged photographs into her paintings with beeswax, incorporated photographic elements, and embedded dried plant forms and seed pods into the surfaces. She also replaced her lush tropical fantasies with abstract references to the nearby Muir Woods in dark, dreamlike compositions that exude a sense of primordial earthiness. These works were shown in True North, Far West at Rosemont Gallery in Regina, Saskatchewan, Canada. In 1988, her work was included in Tropical Topics at the Monterey Peninsula Museum of Art, California, and Fifty Years of Art, San Jose Art League 1938–1988 at the San Jose Museum of Art. The following year, she took a sabbatical from the San Francisco Art Institute to teach as a visiting artist at the University of California, Santa Barbara. During that time, she traveled to Japan Hong Kong, Bangkok, Bali, Jakarta, and Penang. In the fall, she taught at Cooper Union in New York City, where her work was included in the juried exhibition, Primal Forces.

=== Tucson, Arizona, 1990-1999 ===
Rogers joined the University of Arizona School of Art faculty in 1990, teaching painting and drawing. She purchased a home in North Tucson in the Catalina Foothills, Arizona and transformed her property into a desert garden, planting rare cacti specimens. That year, six of her paintings about Hurricane Iwa were included in Bridges: Artists’ Response to Disaster at the Berkeley Art Center in California. In 1991, a solo exhibition of her paintings, Bilder über dem Wasser, toured Germany through the United States Information Agency, followed by an exhibition of works on paper at Frauenmuseum in Bonn, Germany.

In 1994, the University of Arizona Museum of Art presented Constructing Paradise, A Mini-Retrospective of Rogers's works. That year, the Selby Museum of Botany and the Arts in Sarasota, Florida, opened another solo exhibition, Eccentric Gardens of Eccentric Women. In 1995, she was a visiting artist at Colorado State University, and, in 1996, she received the Advising/Mentoring Award from the University of Arizona College of Fine Arts and the Arizona Distinguished Professorship.During that time, Rogers returned to stenciling, a technique she adopted in the 1970s. To work in this manner, she used a printer's brayer charged with paint to roll over hand-cut stencils of curvilinear forms, tendrils, and other nature-inspired patterns. Of the works during this period, Carter Ratcliff declares, “Even the darkest of Rogers's paintings from the 1990s are optimistic, enlivened by the vitality of her inventions. In depicting natural forms, she shares in nature's creative power.”

In 1997, to finance a photo shoot of gardens in Europe, she led a tour to important gardens in Holland, Belgium, France, and Italy. She also participated in Earthly Pleasures: The Garden as Source at the Jewish Community Center in Tucson, Arizona. Arizona State University Art Museum included Rogers's work in Another Arizona, juried by Paul Schimmel, Marilyn Zeitlin, and Heather Lineberry. She ended the decade by traveling to Germany to attend the Digital Photography and Printing Research Workshop in Cologne, Germany, and to Mills College in California to serve as a visiting artist at the invitation of Hung Liu and Michael Grady.

=== Tucson, Arizona, 2000-2010 ===
After traveling to England to photograph various historic gardens in 2000, Rogers had a solo exhibition, Dreaming of Eden: Meditations on the Garden, at the Scottsdale Museum of Contemporary Art in Arizona, and held exhibitions of her work at galleries in Scottsdale and Chicago. The next year, she was a visiting artist at Maine College of Art and also Colby College in Maine. Her work was included in Neobotanica: Flora by Four Contemporary Artists at the Jacksonville Museum of Art, Florida, and the Tucson Museum of Art presented her solo exhibition, Natural Facts: Unnatural Acts. In 2003, she traveled to Cuba to see the 8th Havana Biennial with Arizona State University the following year. On a sabbatical from the University of Arizona, in 2004, she traveled to South Korea as a visiting artist at Pusan National University.

She traveled to Brazil and Argentina the following year, and was a visiting artist at Zayed University and the University of Sharjah in the United Arab Emirates, and her exhibition, Bustan al Janaa (Gardens of Paradise), was held at the Sharjah College of Fine Arts.

In 2006, Rogers attended the book launch for Feminists Who Changed America 1963–1975, in which she was included for awarding Joan Brown the Adaline Kent Award. That year, the Thomas W. Keating Bioresearch Building at the University of Arizona commissioned her to create the painting, Ordinary Miracles: Life in the Desert (2006). In addition to being included in Looking Closer: Inspired by the Beauty of the Sonoran Desert at the Arizona-Sonora Desert Museum, her work appeared in several gallery exhibitions around the country in 2007, the same year that she announced her retirement from the University of Arizona. In 2008, AT&T donated her painting, Nehemiah and Renée with Bubble (1975), to the permanent collection of the Crocker Art Museum in Sacramento, California. She was also a visiting artist at the University of Kansas and exhibited in the Phoenix area. The following year, in 2009, Rogers traveled to India, taught as a visiting artist at the University of Kansas, and was included in Trouble in Paradise at the Tucson Museum of Art, while continuing gallery exhibitions in Arizona, Kansas, and California. In 2010, she was commissioned to create large-scale paintings for Royal Caribbean International's Allure of the Seas, considered the world's largest ship at that Time. The Tucson Museum of Art presented Barbara Rogers: Imperative of Beauty, Fifty-Year Retrospective, in 2012. An accompanying book by the same title was published by Hudson Hills Press, edited by Marilyn Zeitlin, with interviews with Barbara Rogers and essays by Carter Ratcliff and Paul Eli Ivey.

Over the next ten years, she exhibited regularly as a solo artist at the Sherry Leedy Contemporary Art in Kansas City, Missouri, Gebert Contemporary in Scottsdale, Arizona, and Tohono Chul Art Exhibitions and Gardens in Tucson, Arizona, in addition to solo and group exhibitions at galleries in Nebraska, California, and Arizona. In 2021, the Georgia Museum of Art in Athens, Georgia, presented a special showing of her large-scale triptych, Float (2007), which later became part of the San Angelo Museum of Fine Art in San Angelo, Texas. In recent years, Rogers moved her studio to downtown Tucson, where she continues a rigorous painting routine.

== Awards ==
- 1963 Eisner Prize in Painting, University of California
- 1991 International Travel Grant, Office of International Programs, University of Arizona, Tucson, AZ
- 1991 Research Grant, Office of Vice President for Research, University of Arizona, Tucson, AZ
- 1991 Professional Development Grant, Arizona Commission on the Arts
- 1992-93 Fine Arts Summer Research Grant, University of Arizona, Tucson, AZ
- 1996 Advising /Mentoring Award for the College of Fine Art, University of Arizona
- 1996 University of Arizona Distinguished Professorship, University of Arizona
- 1999 Richard Florsheim Art Fund Grant
- 2002 Beyond the Call of Duty Award, Dean's Fund for Excellence, College of Fine Arts, UofA
- 2004 University of Arizona Alumni Association, Extraordinary Faculty Award
- 2007 Dean's Award for Creative Achievement, College of Fine Arts, University of Arizona
- 2015 Lifetime Achievement Award, University of Arizona Museum of Art

== Selected solo exhibitions ==
- 1968 Michael Walls Gallery, San Francisco, CA
- 1969 Michael Walls Gallery, San Francisco, CA
- 1973 Barbara Rogers, curator, Suzanne Foley, San Francisco Museum of Modern Art, San Francisco, CA
- 1975 Michael Walls Gallery, New York, NY
- 1976 Linda Farris Gallery, Seattle, WA
- 1977 Hansen-Fuller Gallery, San Francisco, CA
- 1978 Michael Berger Gallery, Pittsburgh, PA
- 1980 Barbara Rogers, New Works, Marianne Deson Gallery, Chicago, IL
- 1981 Michael Berger Gallery, Pittsburgh, PA
- 1987 Barbara Rogers: A Retrospective of Paintings, University of the Pacific Gallery, CA
- 1989 Embracing Change, with sculptor Bella Feldman, San Jose State University, San Jose, CA
- 1991-92 Bilder Uber dem Wasser, exhibition touring Germany United States Information Agency
- 1992 Barbara Rogers: Paintings on Paper, Frauen Museum, Bonn, Germany
- 1993 Barbara Rogers: Recent Work, Georgia State University, Atlanta, GA
- 1994 Constructing Paradise, A mini-retrospective, University of Arizona Museum of Art, Tucson, AZ
- 1995 Ponds: The Garden Mirror’d, Frederick Spratt Gallery, San Jose, CA
- 1995 Eccentric Gardens by Eccentric Women, The Selby Museum of Botany and the Arts, Sarasota, FL
- 1996 Personal Eden, One West Art Center, Ft. Collins, CO
- 1997 Recent Paintings, Sandy Carson Gallery, Denver, CO
- 1997 Earthy Pleasures: The Garden as Source, Jewish Community Center, Tucson, AZ
- 1998 Her Garden: Objects and Sites Remembered, Etherton Gallery, Temple of Music and Art, Tucson, AZ
- 1998 Retrospective: Works on Paper, Ohio State University, Hopkins Hall Gallery, Columbus, OH
- 1999 Structuring Nature, Eleanor Jeck Galleries, Tucson, AZ
- 2000 Dreaming of Eden: Meditations on the Garden, Curator, Gina Cavallo Collins, Scottsdale
- 2001 Natural Facts: Unnatural Acts, curator, Julie Sasse, Tucson Museum of Art, Tucson, AZ

Hothouse Hybrids, Vanier Gallery, Tucson, AZ

- 2001Garden of Feminine Reason, Oskar Friedl Gallery, Chicago, IL
- 2001 The Necessary Beauty, R.B. Stevenson Gallery, San Diego, CA
- 2002 Barbara Rogers: New Work, Vanier Gallery, Scottsdale, AZ
- 2003 Barbara Rogers: New Work, Chiaroscuro Gallery, Santa Fe, NM
- 2004 Moon Gardens, Dosi Gallery, Pusan, South Korea
- 2024 Barbara Rogers: New Work, Chiaroscuro Gallery, Scottsdale, AZ
- 2005 “Bustan al Janaa” Gardens of Paradise, College of Fine Arts, University of Sharjah, United Arab Emirates
- 2005 Barbara Rogers, New Work, Trinity Gallery, Atlanta, GA
- 2006 Barbara Rogers, Chiaroscuro Gallery, Scottsdale, AZ
- 2007 Fragments...From Day's Caravan: New Work by Barbara Rogers, Graficas Gallery, Tucson, AZ, catalog
- 2007 Barbara Rogers, Gebert Contemporary, Santa Fe, NM
- 2008 Barbara Rogers: New Work, Gebert Contemporary, Scottsdale, AZ
- 2008 Barbara Rogers: New Work, Azora Gallery, Tucson, AZ
- 2009 Barbara Rogers: Garden Archeology, Gebert Gallery, Venice, CA
- 2009 Barbara Rogers: Walking in Paradise, Sherry Leedy Gallery, Kansas City, Missouri
- 2009 Barbara Rogers: Improvisations, Azora Gallery, Tucson, AZ
- 2010 Allure of The Garden, Tucson International Airport, curator David Andres, Tucson, AZ
- 2011 In Bloom, Conrad Wilde Gallery, Tucson, AZ
- 2011 Barbara Rogers: Samsara, Gebert Contemporary, Scottsdale, AZ
- 2012 Barbara Rogers: Imperative of Beauty, Fifty-Year retrospective, Tucson Museum of Art
- 2014 Strange Botany: Sherry Leedy Contemporary Art, Kansas City, MO
- 2014 Barbara Rogers – New Work, Gebert Contemporary, Scottsdale, AZ
- 2017 Beautiful but Dangerous: Barbara Rogers Paintings, Gallery 72, Omaha, NE
- 2017 Barbara Rogers, LXXX, Gebert Contemporary, Scottsdale, AZ
- 2019 Shrines to Botanical Relics, Sherry Leedy Contemporary Art, Kansas City, MO
- 2020 Promises From the Earth, Tubac Center for the Arts, Tubac, AZ
- 2021 Georgia Museum of Art, Athens,GA curator, William Underwood Eiland
- 2021-22 Botanical Therapy, Conway of Asia, Carmel by the Sea, CA

== Published portfolios ==
- 1964 The Bachae, Ed. Il Bisonte, Florence. Delphic Press, New York.
- 1966 The Song of Songs, Ed. Penelope Gallery, Delphic Press, New York.
- 1969 Folk Rock, Blues and Flower Children, Ed. Grafica Romero, Rome.
- 1973 The Garden of Eden, Ed. Stamperia Dell'Orso, Raffaele Bandini, Milan
- 1975 Nature Viva, Ed. Raffaele Bandini, Milan (text by Carlo Bernari)

== Museum and permanent collections ==
- Arizona State University Museum of Art, Tempe, AZ
- Artemizia Foundation Museum of Art, Bisbee, AZ
- Bank of America, San Francisco, CA
- San Angelo Museum of Art, San Angelo, TX
- Canton Museum of Art, Canton, Ohio
- The Center for Neurosciences, Tucson, AZ
- Crocker Museum, Sacramento, CA
- Duke Power and Energy, Houston, TX
- Esteé Lauder Foundation, New York, NY
- Evergreen State College, Olympia, WA
- Kaiser Permanente Hospitals, CA
- Mills College, Oakland, CA
- Oakland Museum, Oakland, CA
- Phoenix Museum of Art, Phoenix, AZ
- Prudential Insurance Company, CA
- San Jose Museum of Art, San Jose, CA
- San Francisco Museum of Modern Art, San Francisco, CA
- Scottsdale Museum of Contemporary Art, Scottsdale, AZ
- Tucson Museum of Art, Tucson, AZ
- University of Arizona Museum of Art, Tucson, AZ
- University of Arizona, College of Nursing, Tucson, AZ
- University of Arizona, Bioscience Research Building (Bio5), Tucson, AZ
- University of California, Berkeley, CA
- University of Iowa Hospital, Iowa City, IA
