= Jeff Stimmel =

American film director and producer

Jeff Stimmel is an American film director and producer. His work as producer/director includes The Art of Failure: Chuck Connelly Not for Sale (2008) which aired on HBO, BBC, and Zdf/ARTE in Germany and France. The film was also an official selection to the Los Angeles Film Festival, Documenta Madrid, and Melbourne International Film Festival The film won the 2009 Emmy Award in the category of Outstanding Programming in Arts and Culture.

Jeff Stimmel has directed several short films, both narrative and non-narrative, including “Somebody Else’s Dream”, “Wait, Ernesto!” “Somebody Else’s Movie”, and the short narrative "After The World" which was an official selection to the Vermont International Film Festival in 2008. In 2001, Stimmel won a PEER Award as producer for The State Of The Artist.

Stimmel was born in Pittsburgh, Pennsylvania, and is a graduate of the University of Pittsburgh, where he was a film studies major. He has also worked for The New York Times Company from 2000-2005 in its non-fiction television division.

Stimmel is president of Divided Eye Films, an independent production company founded in 2005. The company produces documentaries and non-fiction television. The company is based in Los Angeles, California.

The Art of Failure: Chuck Connelly Not for Sale is a feature documentary about the life of Chuck Connelly. Connelly is a mid-career painter who was a rising star in the 1980s art world. However, his notorious behavior, his chemical excesses, and his fierce independence all led to his diminished standing in the art world. After years in the wilderness, Connelly struggles to survive. Eventually, he comes up with a wild scheme in which to stage a comeback in the art world. Connelly hires an unknown actor to play Connelly's long-dead alter-ego and the actor eventually gets a one-man art show in New York City.
