= Louise Norton =

American painter

- Born: June 19, 1888; Kansas City, Missouri
- Died: September 6, 1941 (aged 53); Tucson, Arizona
- Education: University of Missouri and Kansas City Art Institute
- Known for: Painting
- Movement: Desert Landscapes

Louise Norton (June 19, 1888 – September 6, 1941) was a Kansas City-born American artist who was a founding member of the arts colony in Tucson, Arizona, in the early part of the twentieth century. She was a pioneering female painter who helped shape the culture of Arizona and the Southwest.

== Life and Art ==
Norton was born to Ruth Moore and John W. Norton. Her family moved to a ranch five miles outside of Prescott, Arizona, when she was four years old. She attended Prescott High School and graduated with honors from the University of Missouri. She then attended the Kansas City Art Institute.

She traveled abroad throughout Europe and Tahiti to paint. She was lauded for her portraits and still life paintings.

During World War I she was in government service in Washington D.C.

Norton was one of the original four members of the Pallet and Brush, the original art colony of the south-western city of Tucson. She also served on the first board of directors of the Tucson Fine Arts Association which would ultimately become the Tucson Museum of Art. Her paintings were exhibited at the New Mexico Museum of Fine Art at Santa Fe, in Kansas City, New York, Washington and throughout Arizona.

== Works Progress Administration (WPA) ==
She was responsible for setting up and organizing women’s work projects under the WPA in Cochise, Santa Cruz, Pima and Pinal counties. After five and a half years, her title for the WPA was Area Supervisor for Community Service.

== Death ==
After a multi-month illness Norton died on September 6, 1941, at her home in Tucson, Arizona, located at 346 East Speedway Boulevard in the West University Historic District.

== Legacy ==
Her work is in the permanent collection of the National Gallery in Washington D.C. She was a member of Kappa Alpha Theta and the Altrusa Club. In 1930, she was awarded first prize in painting from the Northern Arizona Museum.

== Notes ==
- Tucson Daily Citizen, Miss Norton Reviews Brandiff Pictures, November 15, 1930
