= SS Grecian (1879) =

History
- Name: (United Kingdom of Great Britain and Ireland) SS Grecian
- Owner: Allan Line
- Port of registry: (United Kingdom of Great Britain and Ireland) Glasgow, United Kingdom
- Builder: William Doxford & Sons
- Yard number: 116
- Launched: 16 October 1879
- Completed: April 1880
- Acquired: April 1880
- Maiden voyage: 21 April 1880
- In service: 21 April 1880
- Out of service: 9 February 1902
- Identification: Official number: 82296; Call sign: TDJN
- Fate: Run aground and wrecked on 9 February 1902

General characteristics
- Type: Passenger ship
- Tonnage: 3,481 GRT
- Length: 109.9 metres (360 ft 7 in)
- Beam: 12.2 metres (40 ft 0 in)
- Depth: 9.4 metres (30 ft 10 in)
- Installed power: Compound engine
- Propulsion: Two screws
- Sail plan: Glasgow - Quebec - Montreal
- Speed: 11 knots
- Capacity: Accommodation for 820 passengers (50 in First class, 270 in Second class & 500 in Steerage)
- Notes: Two masts, a single funnel

SS Grecian was a British Passenger ship that rescued the survivors of the SS La Bourgogne disaster, after the ship collided with Cromartyshire on 4 July 1898. The ship ran aground and was wrecked off Sandwich Point, Halifax, Nova Scotia on 9 February 1902.

== Construction ==
Grecian was built as the William Doxford & Sons shipyard in Sunderland, United Kingdom and launched on 16 October 1879 before being completed in April 1880. The ship was 109.9 metres (360 ft 7 in) long, had a beam of 12.2 metres (40 ft 0 in) and a depth of 9.4 metres (30 ft 10 in). She was assessed at 3,481 GRT and had a Compound engine driving a screw propeller that could achieve a speed of 11 knots. The ship had accommodation for 820 passengers including 50 in First class, 270 in Second class & 500 in Steerage.

== Career ==
Grecian sailed on her maiden voyage from Glasgow to Quebec and Montreal on 21 April 1880 and arrived at her destination without incident on 19 May 1880. The ship would go on to sail that route throughout most of her career with other destinations such as South America, the United States, Ireland and France being sparsely frequented. Grecian also briefly served as a troopship for the Egyptian Expedition in 1882.

== Rescue of La Bourgogne survivors ==
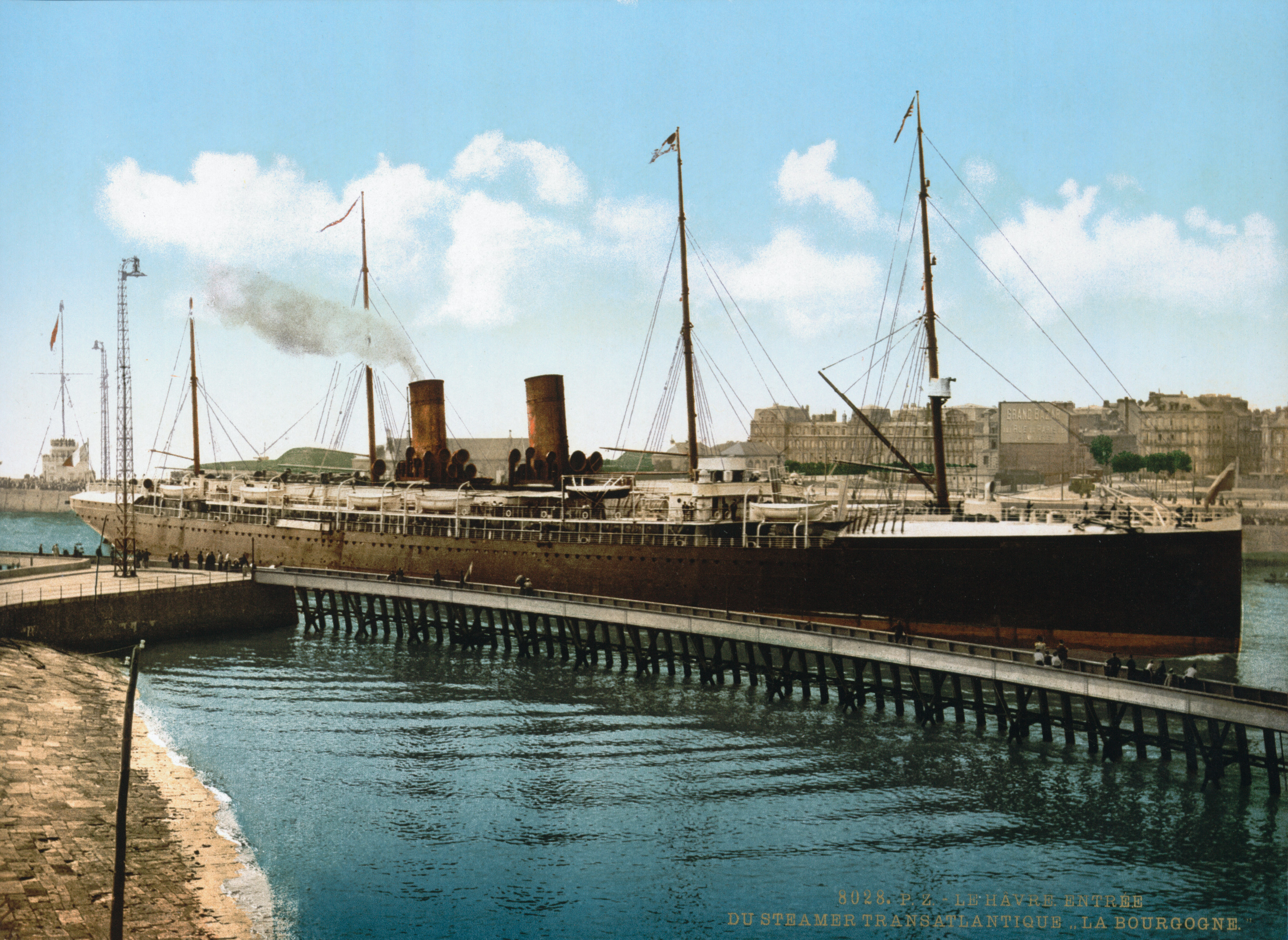
La Bourgogne in 1895.

Grecian was on a routine voyage from Glasgow to Montreal when, off the Grand Banks of Newfoundland on 4 July 1898 at 3 pm, her crew sighted the signals of a ship in distress and came to her aid. She encountered the damaged sailing ship Cromartyshire which had collided with the passenger ship La Bourgogne in a fog earlier that night, sinking La Bourgogne killing 562 of her passengers and crew.

The 163 survivors of La Bourgogne had been rescued by Cromartyshire. They were subsequently transferred onto Grecian, which was more suitable to carry people, and then took the damaged sailing vessel in tow to Halifax, where they arrived on 6 July.

== Loss ==
Grecian was on a voyage from Liverpool to St John's and Halifax under the command of Captain James Harrison when, on 9 February 1902, the ship ran aground off Sandwich Point as she was trying to find the entrance to the harbour of Halifax during a snow squall. Several attempts were made by her crew to refloat the ship, but none were successful before a severe storm hit the ship and broke her in two amidships after having driven her further upon the rocks on 17 February, making the ship a total loss. An inquiry into the loss of Grecian was held and Captain Harrison testified that there was a slight deviation of the compass and that he would not have attempted to enter the harbour during the snow squall had he not taken a harbour pilot on board. The Court of Inquiry lay the blame of the loss on Captain Harrison, as they concluded that had he insisted that the pilot apply the proper deviation, the Grecian wouldn't have been lost. Harrison's master certificate was suspended for a period of three months and the wreck of Grecian was scrapped in situ.

== Bibliography ==
"Loss of the French Liner La Bourgogne With 550 Lives". Marine Engineering. 2 (August). New York: Marine Publishing Company: 24–25. 1898 – via Google Books.
