= De Scott Evans =

American painter (1847–1898)

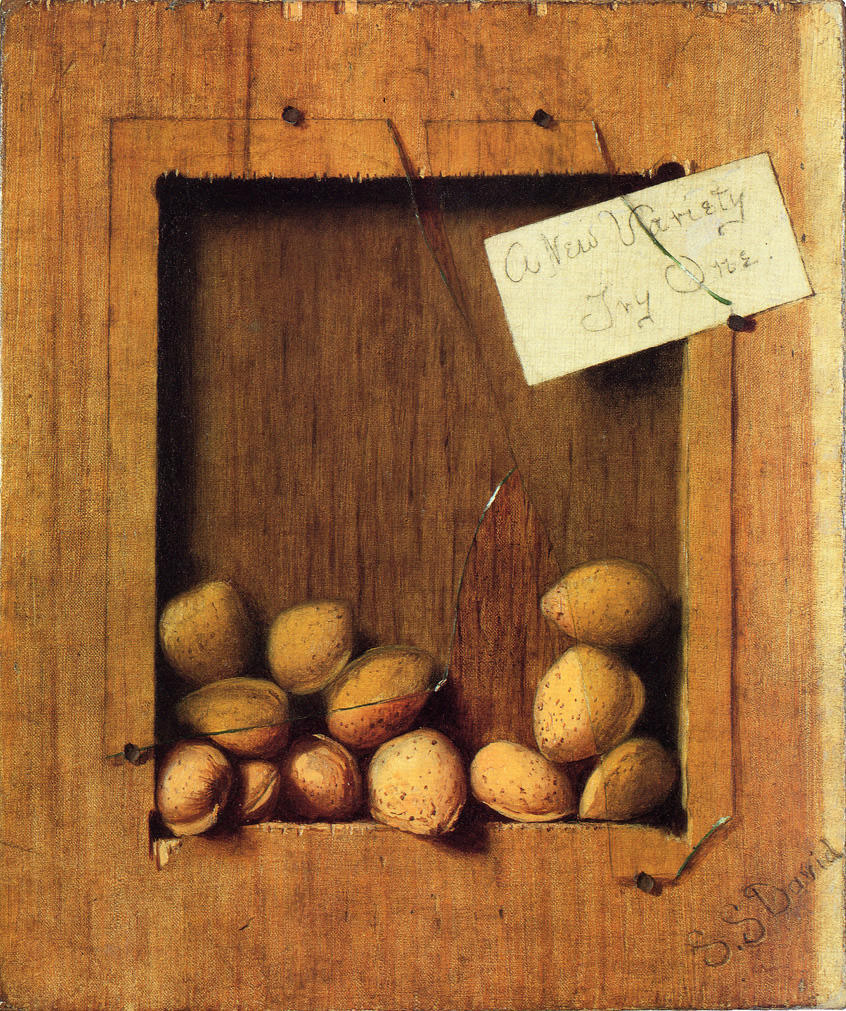
- A New Variety, Try One, Columbus Museum of Art. Signed "S.S. David"; attributed to Evans.
- Born: David Scott Evans; March 28, 1847; Boston, Indiana, United States
- Died: July 4, 1898 (aged 51); Cape Sable Island, Nova Scotia, Canada
- Occupation: Artist
- Spouse: Alice Josephine Burk (1872–1898; his death) 3 children

De Scott Evans (March 28, 1847 – July 4, 1898) was an American painter known for working in a number of genres. Raised in Indiana, he spent much of his career in Ohio and then moved to New York City. His posthumous reputation is largely based on a number of trompe-l'œil still lifes that have been attributed to him.

== Life ==
David Scott Evans was born in Boston, Indiana to David S. and Nancy A. (Davenport) Evans. His father was a physician. He attended Miami University's preparatory school in the 1860s, studying with professor Adrian Beaugureau at Miami and later in Cincinnati. Evans married Alice Josephine Burk in 1872. They had two biological daughters, Mabel and Blanche, and an adopted daughter, Laura.

In 1873, he became head of the art department at Mount Union College in Alliance, Ohio, and taught there until 1875. Evans then lived in Paris from 1877 to 1878, where he studied with Adolphe William Bouguereau. He then taught from 1882 to 1887 at the Cleveland Academy of Art, and then moved to New York City in 1887, at the age of forty.

Evans and his three daughters were among 562 people who were killed on July 4, 1898, when the La Bourgogne, bound for Le Havre, collided with a sailing ship and sank in the North Atlantic. His wife was not on board and later remarried. There is a cenotaph for Evans and his daughters in the Oxford Cemetery in Oxford, Ohio.

== Work and legacy ==
During his life, he was mainly known for his genre paintings and portraits of stylish young women in rich settings. His popularity faded after his death, until a number of trompe-l'œil still lifes were attributed to him. Evans is known to have signed his work as D. Scott Evans and later De Scott Evans, and some of the still lifes attributed to him bear the names David Scott, S. S. David, and Stanley S. David. The attributions are not without question, but are assumed based on the similarity of two paintings of pears, and scholars' inability to identify another artist named "David" who was active at the right time and place.

== Gallery ==
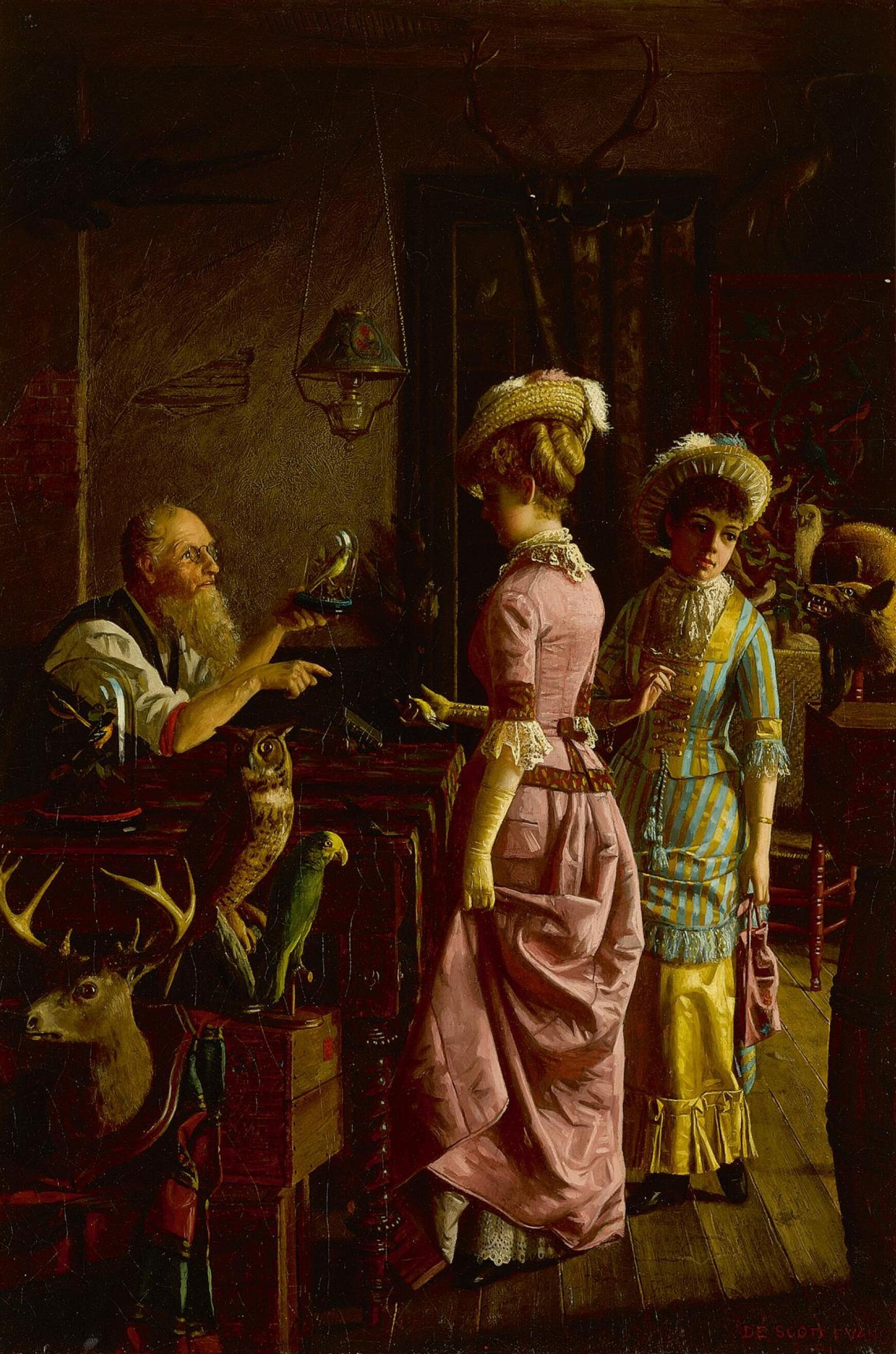
Taxidermist (1881)

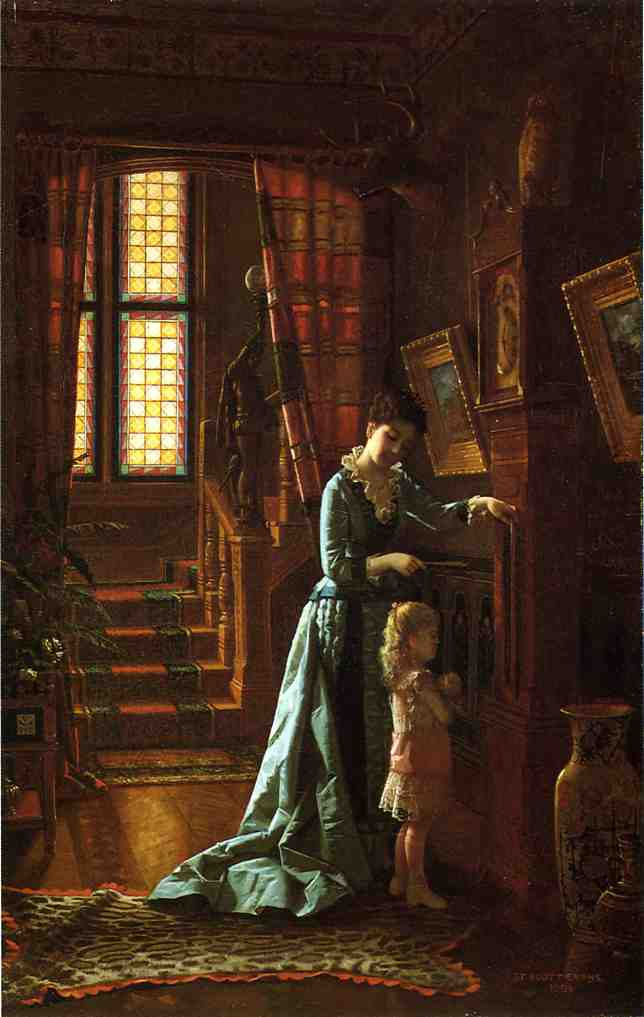
Grandfathers Clock (1881)

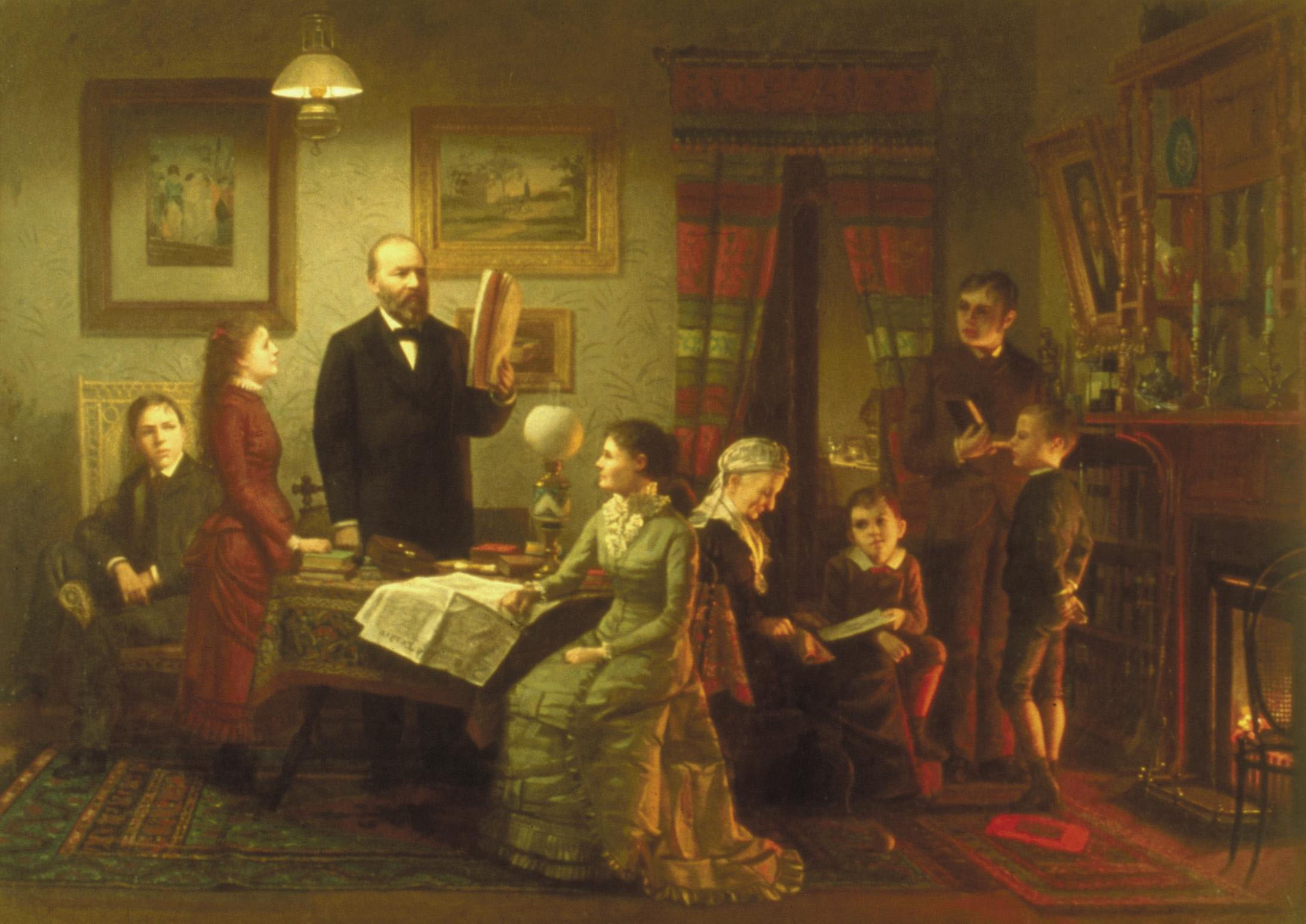
Winter Evening in Lawnfield (c.1881–87)

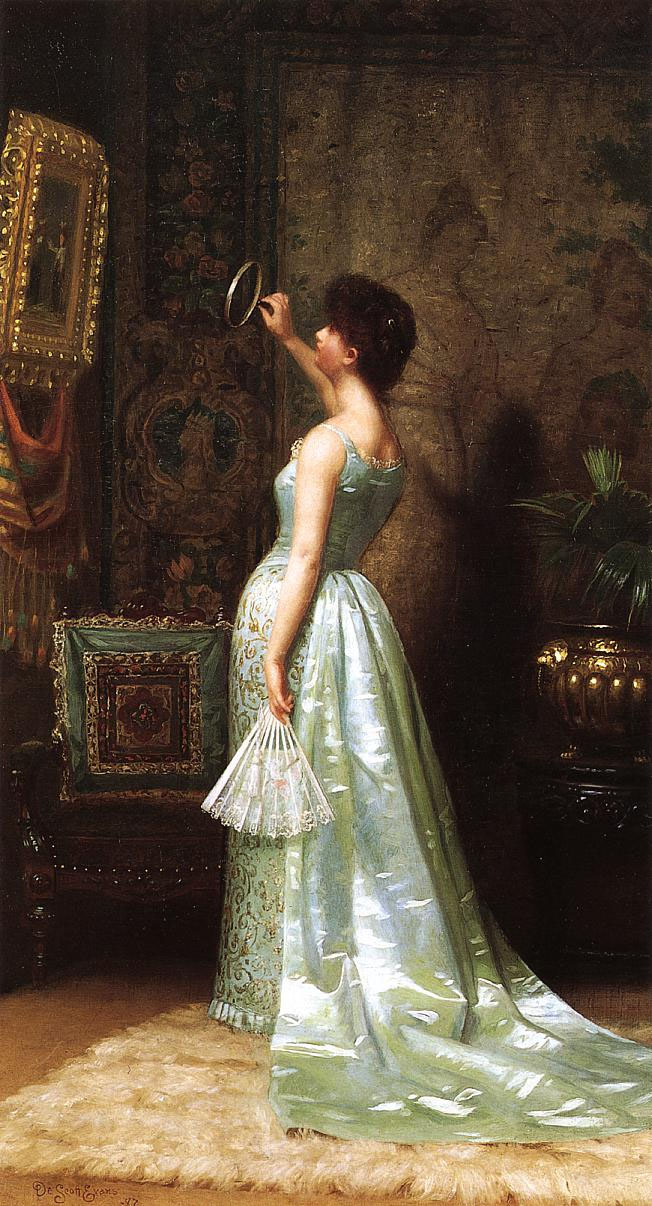
The Connoisseur (1887)

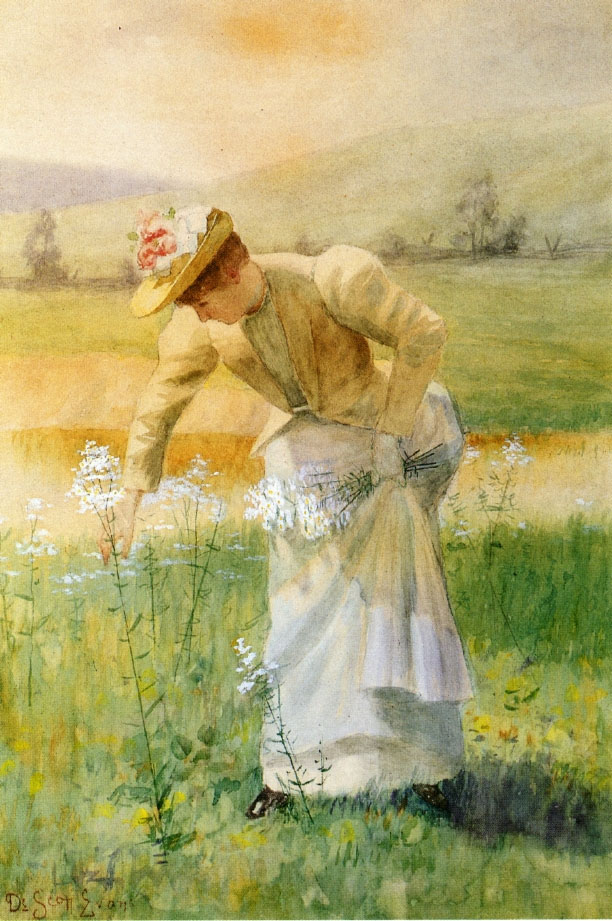
Woman Picking Flowers (1887)

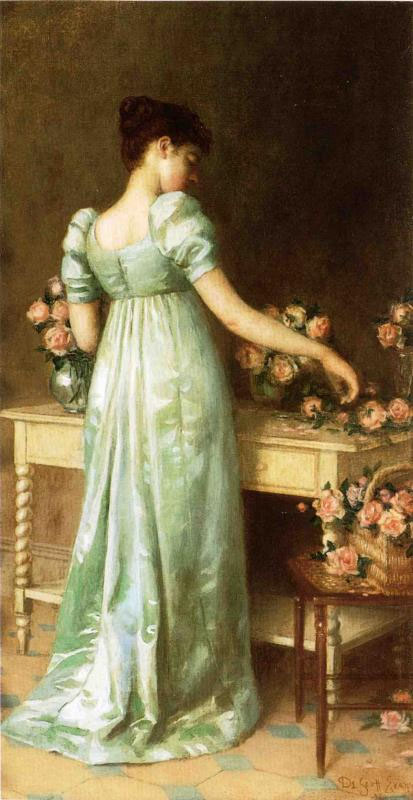
Arranging Pink Roses (1891)

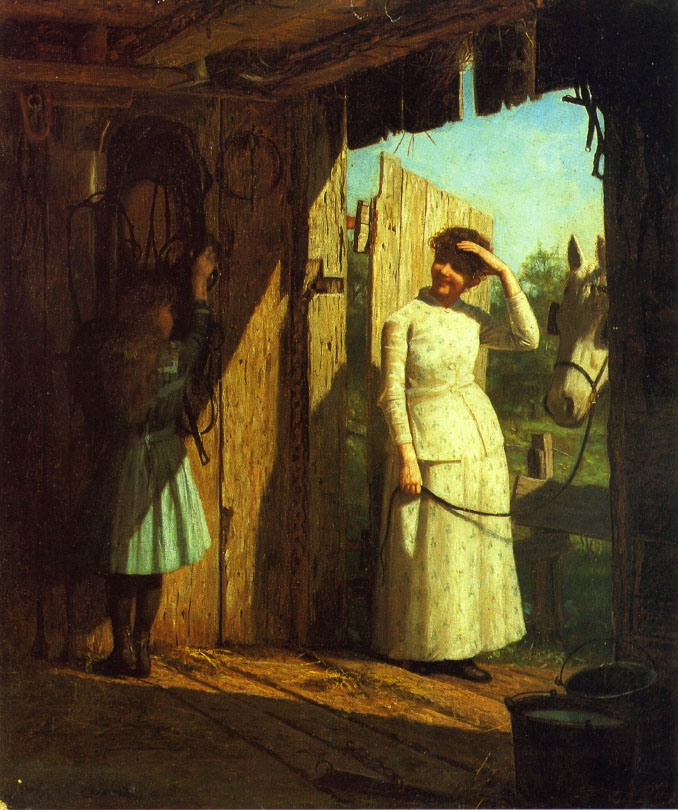
The Tack Room
(date unknown)

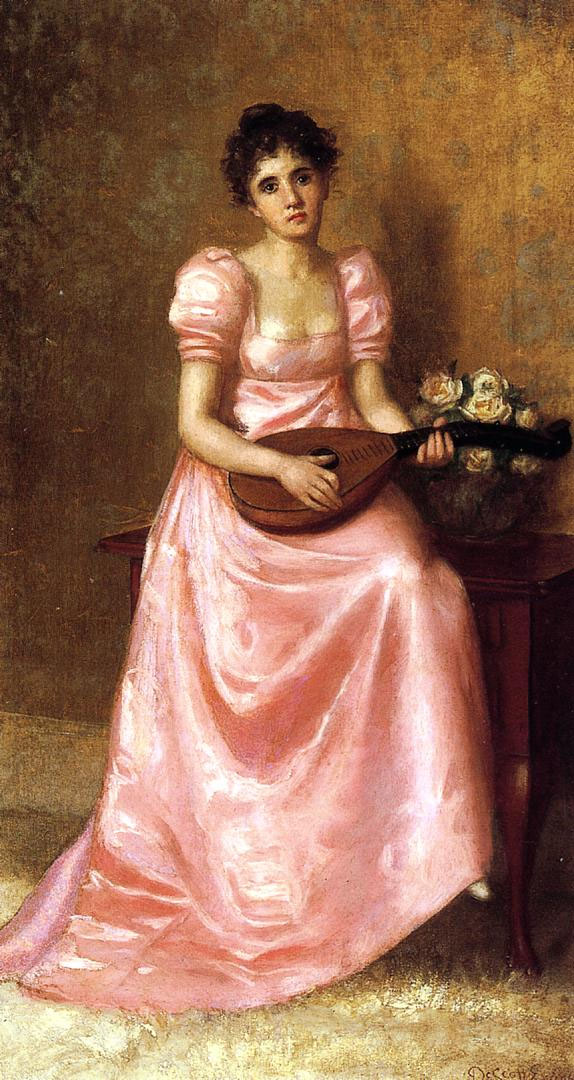
Woman Playing a Mandoliln
(date unknown)

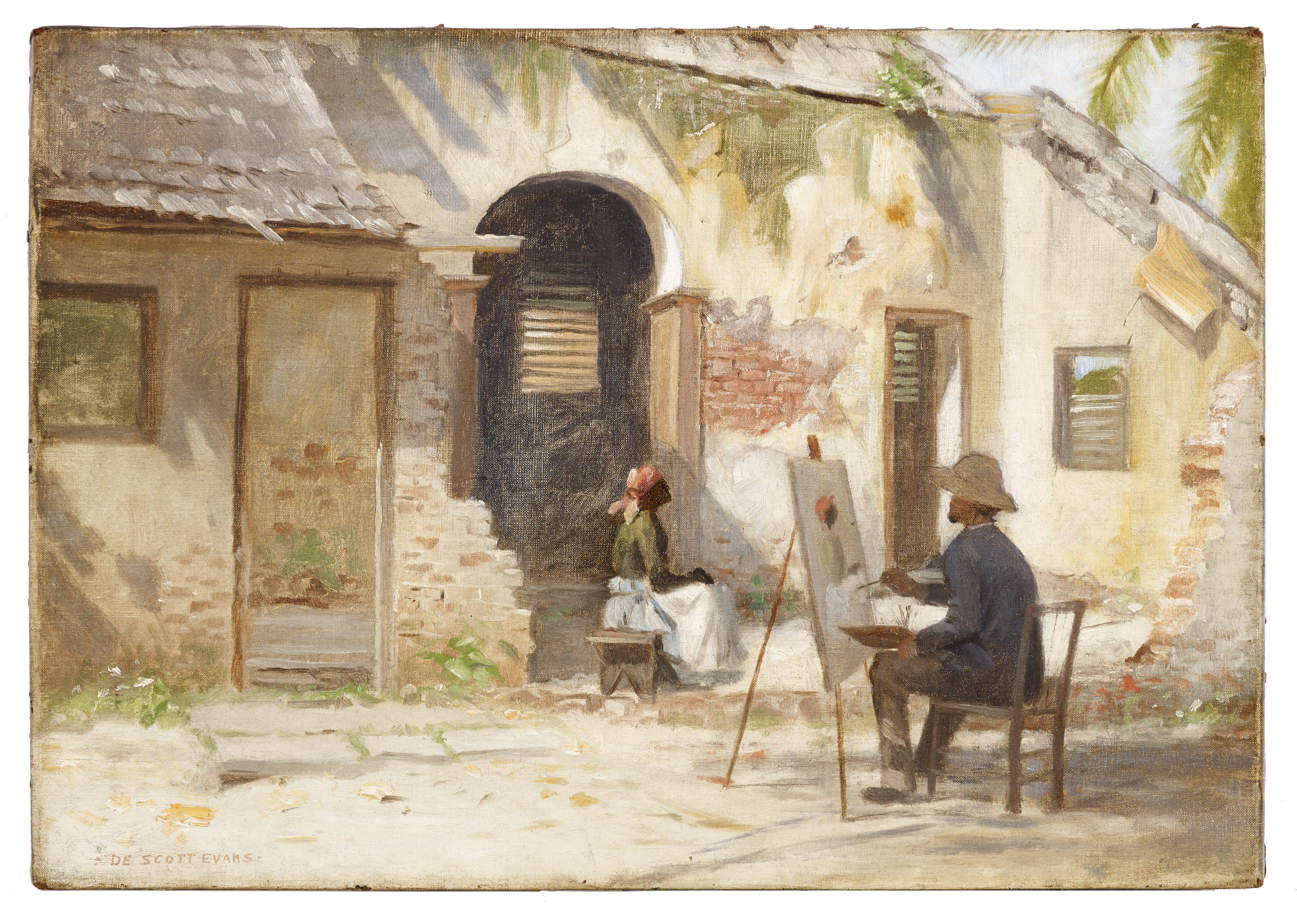
Scene on the Island of Jamaica
(date unknown)

== Other references ==
- Burnet, Mary Q. (1921). Art and Artists of Indiana. New York: The Century Co.
- Haverstock, Mary Sayer, Jeannette Mahoney Vance, Brian L. Meggitt, Jeffrey Weidman (1999) Artists in Ohio, 1787-1900: A Biographical Dictionary. Kent State University Press
