= Sinking of SS La Bourgogne =

1898 maritime disaster

Sinking of the SS La Bourgogne
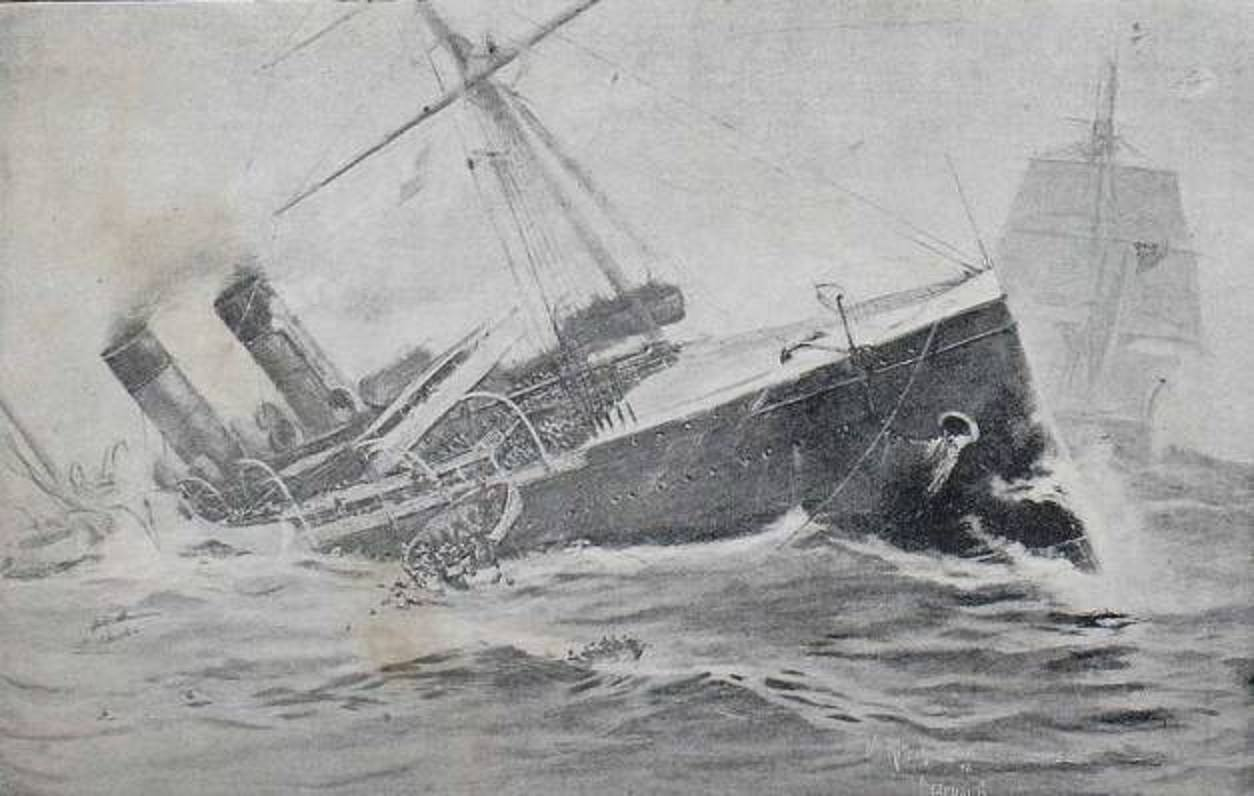
- Contemporary illustration of the sinking of La Bourgogne
- Date: 4 July 1898; 128 years ago
- Location: Off Cape Sable, Nova Scotia, in the North Atlantic Ocean; 43°00′N 65°36′W
- Type: Maritime disaster
- Cause: Collision with the Cromartyshire
- Participants: La Bourgogne crew and passengers
- Deaths: 550–600

On 4 July 1898, the SS La Bourgogne collided with the sailing ship Cromartyshire while the two ships were in thick fog off Newfoundland, and Cromartyshire had reduced speed, but La Bourgogne was steaming at high speed. The La Bourgogne sank forty minutes after the collision, killing 562 of the 725 people aboard. It was, at the time, one of the worst maritime disasters in history.

Only 13 percent of her passengers survived, compared with 48 percent of her crew. 200 of her passengers were women, but only one survived. Passengers included numerous children, none of whom survived. It was alleged that after the collision, some of the steamship's officers failed to do their duty to minimise loss of life, and members of either her own crew or a group of seamen who were steerage passengers fought to save themselves to the exclusion of other passengers.

Owners of the Cromartyshire, and the relatives of dozens of the victims of the sinking, sued the Compagnie Générale Transatlantique (CGT) for damages. The sailing ship's owners won, but CGT won limitation of liability against the other claimants. Some claimants won only a fraction of the amount they claimed, and others lost their cases altogether. Claims continued until 1908, when the Supreme Court of the United States ruled that although La Bourgogne's excessive speed caused the collision, CGT was not at fault.

== Background ==
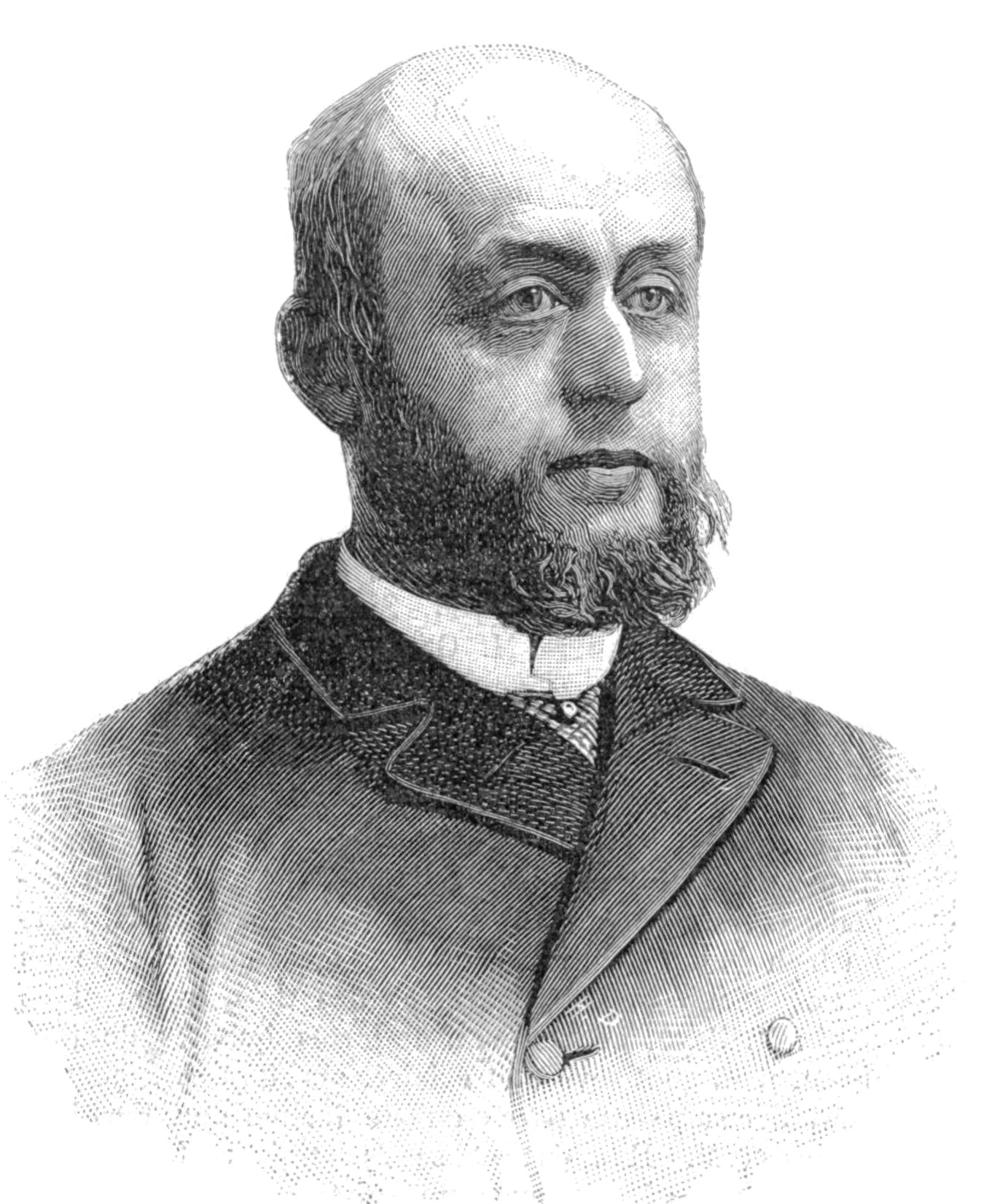
Captain Louis Deloncle

La Bourgogne was part of a class of four new ocean liners ordered by the CGT in 1886, for its transatlantic route between Le Havre and New York. She made her maiden voyage on 19 June 1886, and made a record crossing of seven days, 15 hours, and 21 minutes from Le Havre to New York.

By July 1898, La Bourgogne's master was 44-year-old Captain Louis Deloncle, who had been with CGT for about five years. His previous command was the liner La Normandie. In 1895 La Normandie suffered an explosion of gas from the coal in one of her bunkers, which caused a fire in one of her cargo holds. Deloncle and his Second Captain, Dupont, were awarded gallantry medals for their "cool and couraegous" handling of the fire. He commanded La Normandie at the fleet review at Spithead for the Diamond Jubilee of Queen Victoria in June 1897.

Deloncle had been a lieutenant de vaisseau in the French Navy. He wrote a handbook on marine manœuvres, which the Navy had adopted as a standard textbook. He taught tactics at the School of Gunnery. He was nicknamed Loup de Mer ("Sea Wolf"), due to his thorough knowledge of naval matters. He was a brother of the French politicians François and Charles Deloncle, and of journalist Henri Deloncle; his son Eugène was involved in the far-right terrorist group La Cagoule.

== Collision with Cromartyshire ==
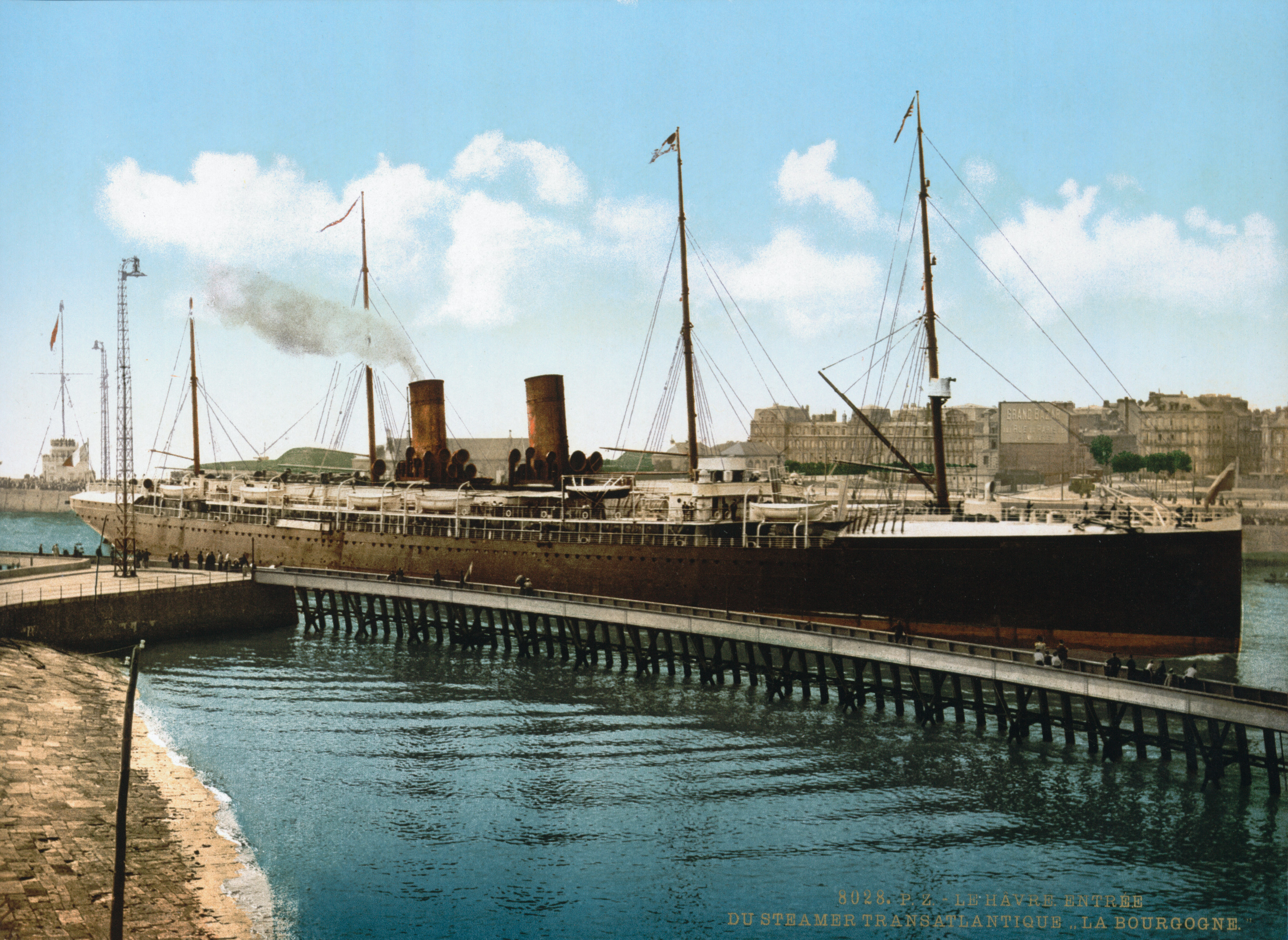
SS La Bourgogne

On 2 July 1898, La Bourgogne left the North River in New York for Le Havre. She carried a total of 725 people: 83 passengers in first class, 123 in second, 297 in steerage, and 222 crew. She also carried cargo worth $300,000 to $400,000, and 170 bags of mail. Her passengers included a party of Austro-Hungarian seamen, and a party of about 75 Armenians, including a priest, and 13 Assyrians.

Two days later La Bourgogne ran into dense fog off the Grand Banks of Newfoundland, reducing visibility to about 20 yards (18 metres), but maintained high speed. Also, she was 160 nautical miles (300 km) off the eastbound transatlantic shipping lane on which she should have been.

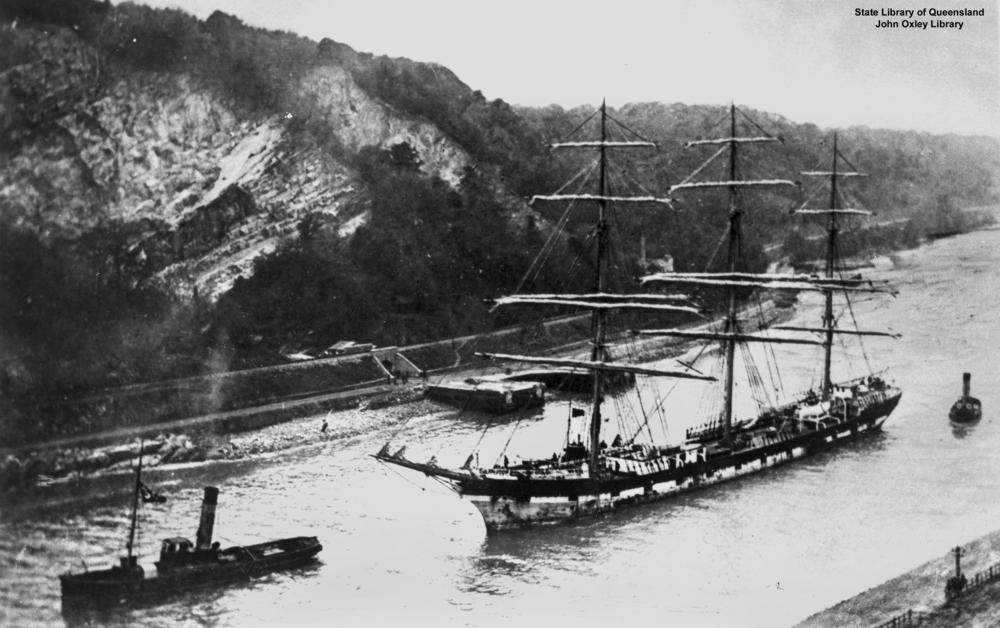
Cromartyshire

On 8 June the three-masted, iron-hulled sailing ship Cromartyshire had left Dunkirk with a cargo of coal for Philadelphia. Early on the morning of 4 July she was sailing through fog, about 60 nautical miles (110 km) off Cape Sable Island, Nova Scotia, sounding her foghorn every minute. She was under reduced sail and was making only about 4 to 5 knots (7 to 9 km/h). La Bourgogne heard Cromartyshire's foghorn, and answered with her steam whistle, but neither ship's lookouts could see the other ship. At 05:00 hrs Cromartyshire's bow struck the starboard side of La Bourgogne at an oblique angle. The sailing ship's master, Captain Oscar Henderson, said the steamship was going at "terrific speed".

The impact was just abaft La Bourgogne's bridge. The sailing ship's bow penetrated the steamship's engine room below the waterline and raked her starboard side, smashing La Bourgogne's starboard lifeboat number 1, and damaging lifeboats numbers 3 and 5. Captain Deloncle set course for Cape Sable Island, but La Bourgogne lost steam, rendering her unable to work her main pumps. La Bourgogne fired a distress rocket and flare, and raised lights to indicate she was in danger.

== Sinking ==
Most of the passengers were in bed and asleep until the two ships collided. La Bourgogne's starboard lifeboats and some liferafts were launched, but survivors alleged that the liner's officers were ineffective, and the ratings sought to save themselves rather than the passengers. Some passengers resorted to trying to launch boats and rafts themselves, and alleged afterward that some members of the crew "chased them away" and took the boats and rafts for themselves. One passenger alleged that a crewman on deck used an oar to beat a passenger to prevent him from reaching a liferaft. He and other passengers alleged that occupants of lifeboats used boat hooks and oars to stop passengers in the water from boarding their boat. One passenger alleged that he and his elderly mother were thrown out of a lifeboat into the sea. One survivor alleged that some passengers were threatened with knives. Survivors said that the only member of La Bourgogne's crew who made a professional effort to launch lifeboats was the Second Officer, Delinge.

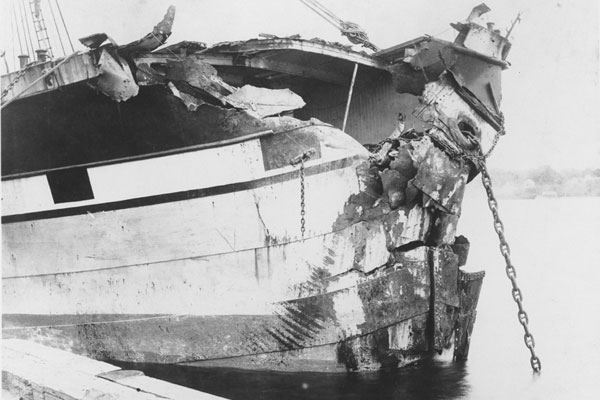
Cromartyshire's damaged bow after the collision

Captain Henderson ordered Cromartyshire's crew to prepare her boats to be lowered, and went forward to inspect her bow. He found extensive damage, but the sailing ship was not in immediate danger of sinking. The two ships lost each other in the fog, but Henderson saw the rocket and flare that La Bourgogne fired, and he had several distress rockets and flares fired from Cromartyshire. At about 05:30 hrs the fog thinned enough for Henderson to see two of La Bourgogne's lifeboats being rowed toward his ship. This was the first he knew that the steamship had sunk.

Cromartyshire rescued the occupants of the two boats, stood to, and launched its own three boats to rescue other survivors, many of them on life rafts or clinging to wreckage. At about 15:00 hrs she sighted a westbound steamship, Allan Line's SS Grecian, and signalled to her. Survivors were transferred to Grecian, which towed the sailing ship to Halifax, Nova Scotia, where they arrived on 6 July.

CGT was quick to deny the allegations against its officers and ratings. It claimed they had acted correctly, and that the seamen who assaulted passengers had been travelling in steerage and were not members of the ship's crew. CGT claimed that the Chief Officer commanded starboard boat number 7, which was full of women and children, and was successfully launched, but was then crushed by one of the ship's two funnels falling upon it. The French Consul-General in New York, Edmond Bruwaert, reported that starboard boat number 9 had conveyed 53 survivors to Cromartyshire, and its crew had then done all they could to rescue other survivors.

CGT said that ten or a dozen sailors from among the steerage passengers commandeered starboard boat number 11, refused to come to the aid of anyone else, and fought off anyone else who tried to board their boat. One passenger said that the sailors in the boat were "Austrian". It was later clarified that they were from Dalmatia and Croatia, which then were provinces of Austria-Hungary.

Survivors of La Bourgogne's crew were returned to New York, where Bruwaert questioned them. On 9 July the crew, along with about a dozen of the surviving steerage passengers, were sent to France aboard the CGT liner La Touraine. On arrival in France they were to be surrendered to the French Admiralty for further questioning. They reached Le Havre aboard SS La Touraine on 17 July.

Survivors described the conduct of Deloncle and his officers. One of La Bourgogne's stokers claimed that they all acted correctly but were impeded by some of the passengers. However, Charles Liebra, from Philadelphia, said that Deloncle told the "saloon passengers" (i.e. first class) that there was no danger. An Austro-Hungarian passenger, Matteo Turich, was on deck and saw the collision as it happened. He alleged "No commands were being given and no system prevailed". A Swiss passenger, Fred Nyffeler, also alleged that just after the collision, an officer told him "nothing" was wrong. Nyffeler alleged that as the ship listed, and passengers and crew made for the lifeboats, Deloncle "had evidently lost his head, and was walking up and down the bridge screaming and swearing".

== Victims and survivors ==
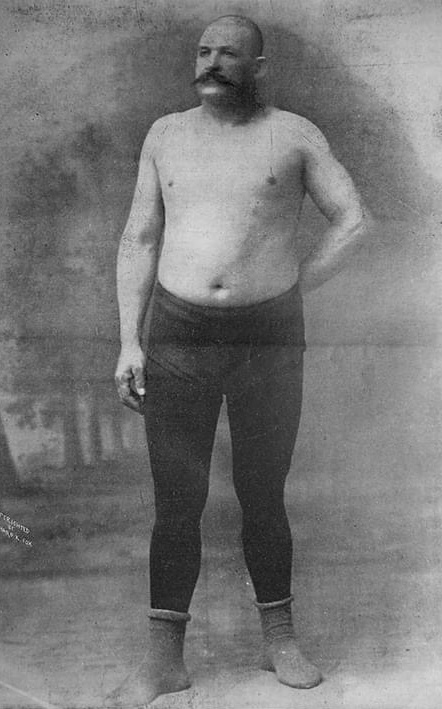
Yusuf İsmail

Only 163 people survived. La Bourgogne's passengers included about 200 women, but only one was saved. The survivors included 104 of 222 crew, but only 61 of 503 passengers. Most of the first class passengers were also killed.

Captain Deloncle, all of the deck officers, and most of the engineer officers died in the sinking. The Purser and the Fourth Engineer were the only officers who survived.

Victims of the sinking included the artists and sculptors De Scott Evans, Léon Pourtau, and Emil Wuertz; Turkish wrestler Yusuf İsmail; the wife and child of George Deslions; and the wife and daughter of Judge John Forrest Dillon. Porteau was principal clarinetist of the Boston Symphony Orchestra, and two other BSO musicians were also killed in the sinking. Anthony Pollok, a colleague of Alexander Graham Bell, and his wife, both died in the sinking.

Two clergy were also killed: the Roman Catholic Father Anthony Kesseler of New York, and the Armenian Apostolic Church priest Stepan Der Stepanian with his wife and three children. Only eight of the 75 Armenian passengers survived, and only one of the 13 Assyrians.

== Aftermath ==
On 17 July 1898 the Master of the ship E. J. Spicer recovered one of La Bourgogne's liferafts at position 42°05′N 57°12′W. On it were three or four life preservers and a number of oars.

Before the end of July a funeral for the victims of the sinking was held at La Madeleine, Paris. The congregation included the French foreign minister, minister of commerce, numerous senators and deputies, and Admiral Jules de Cuverville, who had been Deloncle's commanding officer when he was in the French Navy.

Days before the funeral, Rowland Strong, The New York Times correspondent in Paris, attacked the whole Deloncle family. He called them "a hysterical, half-witted set, and personally I should never have cared to trust my life or property to any one of them. Louis Deloncle... used to boast of his skill in manoeuvring a ship, which, to judge from the accounts of his own friends and his surviving brother, principally consisted in threatening to run down any vessel that came in his way. "Je pass ou je tire dessus". In other words, "I mean to pass or I will fire," was the remark he made when navigating the Normandie through the crush of vessels at the great naval review held last year at Portsmouth in honor of the Queen's jubilee. Only a madman could have given expression to such an intention."

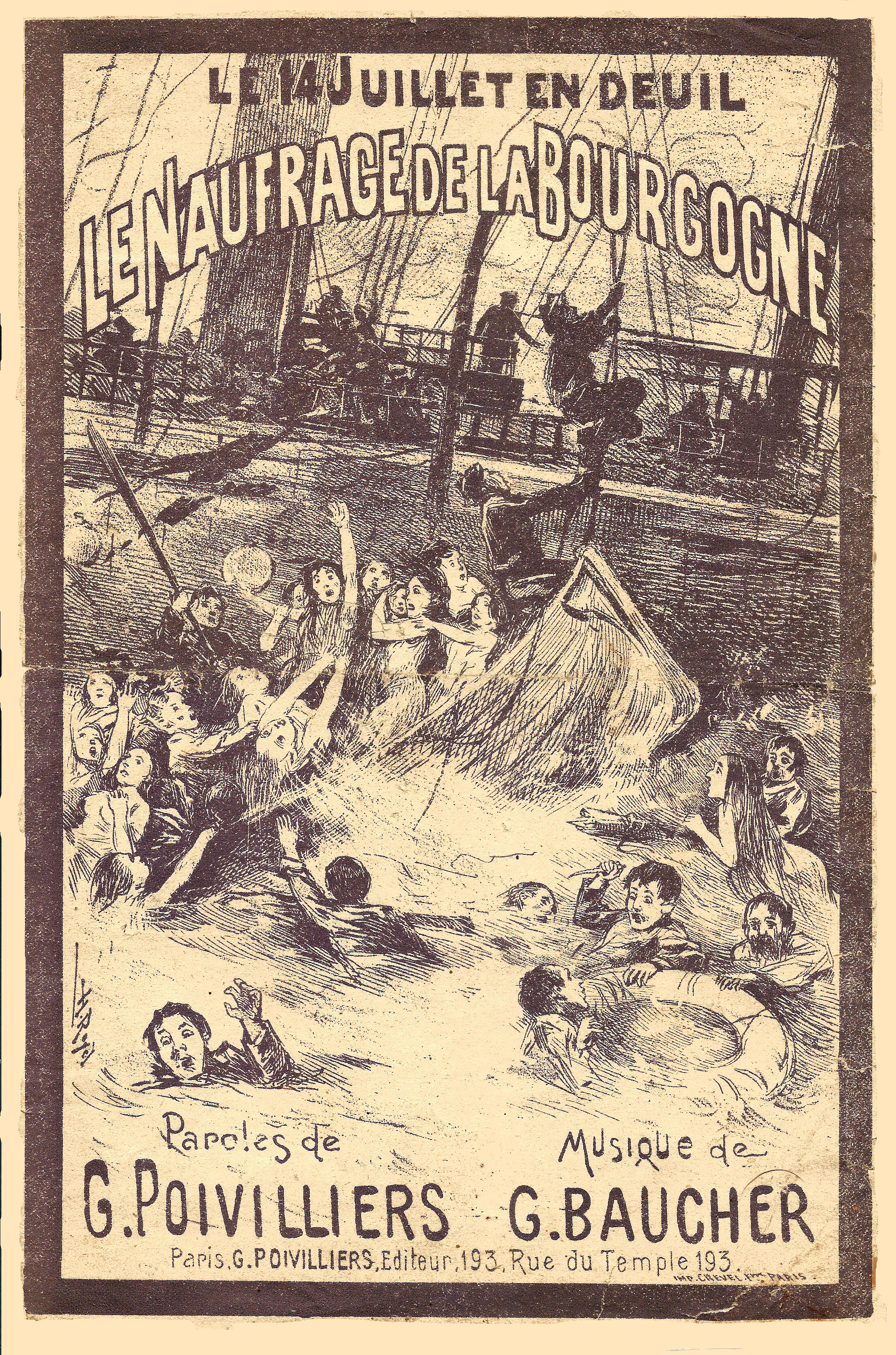
Cover of a song, Le Naufrage de La Bourgogne, published after the sinking

Seafarers reported seeing bodies, apparently from La Bourgogne, floating in the area up to two months after the sinking. On 6 August the Master of the schooner Florence reported finding the body of a man floating at position 43°28′N 59°55′W. In his clothing was the passport of one of La Bourgogne's cabin passengers, Dr Candido Diaz, and a draft for FF 215,000. On 22 August the Master of the Hamburg America Line steamship Christiania reported passing two bloated bodies floating face down at position 43°N 60°W. One was a man wearing a life belt, and the other was apparently a woman. On 2 September the Master of the fishing schooner William H. Cross reported that he and his crew picked up the body of a man. They recovered money, drafts, and other papers of value from the body, and then weighted it and buried it at sea.

=== Legal cases ===
A panel made up of the Wreck Commissioner at Halifax and two other sea captains investigated the collision on behalf of the Canadian government. Their report, published by 29 July, exonerated Cromartyshire's Master and officers. They found that La Bourgogne was not following the sea lane indicated on the nautical chart for that part of the North Atlantic, and was steaming at great speed. They found that had Captain Deloncle "adopted the rules laid down... his vessel could not have been in the position indicated by the disaster". Further, the panel reported that "many of the principal steamship companies do not follow the routes laid down and assented to by all the parties in interest and apparent good faith."

Cromartyshire's owner sued CGT in the Admiralty Division of the High Court of Justice in London for the damage to his ship. CGT sought to quash the writ on the grounds that it was a foreign corporation. On 9 August 1898 Francis Jeune, President of the Admiralty Division, ruled that the English court has jurisdiction, and he rejected CGT's plea. On 12 January 1899 the Admiralty Division found in Cromartyshire's favour and awarded her owners damages and costs. The court found that La Bourgogne was sailing at excessive speed, which was why the sailing ship's bow raked so far along the steamship's side. This ruptured more than one of her bulkheads, causing her to list and then sink relatively quickly. It also damaged her starboard lifeboats, and the list so far to starboard prevented her port boats from being lowered.

Relatives of the dead also sued CGT. 15 lawsuits were begun in New York, and by 24 August claimants were considering whether to transfer proceedings to London, or to Paris. One New York widower sued CGT for $30,000 for the death of his wife.

On 5 October 1898 one of La Bourgogne's survivors, Eugene Eggenschewiler, was charged with embezzlement. He had worked for a factory in New Jersey that processed leather. He had stolen the formula for one of the company's secret processes, defrauded the company of $65 to $70, and persuaded the company to pay his fare to Europe for a holiday. In fact he embarked on La Bourgogne carrying $6,000, and planned to start a business in France using the secret formula that he had stolen. His plan was thwarted by the ship being sunk.

On 29 December 1898 the owners of the schooner William H. Cross brought a lawsuit in the United States District Court for the District of Massachusetts in Boston against the dead body that they had found and buried three months earlier (see above). In the body's clothing they found US and French money to the value of $1,050. Efforts to find his relatives, to whom to return the money, had failed, so the owners were suing the body as a derelict.

On 28 June 1899 a court in Paris awarded FF 100,000 damages to a Madame Resal for the death of her husband aboard La Bourgogne. The court found Captain Deloncle at fault, and CGT responsible for his actions. However, on 18 January 1900 a court of appeal in Paris overturned the verdict, finding that neither Captain Deloncle nor CGT to be at fault.

On 22 March 1900, the United States Court of Appeals for the Seventh Circuit in Chicago dismissed the lawsuit of Charles Rundell against CGT. He was administrator of the estate of Edwin Rundell, who had been killed in the sinking. Judges Woods, Allen, and Bunn found that it was not shown that Rundell had died on La Bourgogne, and that a US District Court cannot enforce the law of France. Rundell had claimed $55,000. Six other suits, also each claiming $55,000, were also to be dismissed.

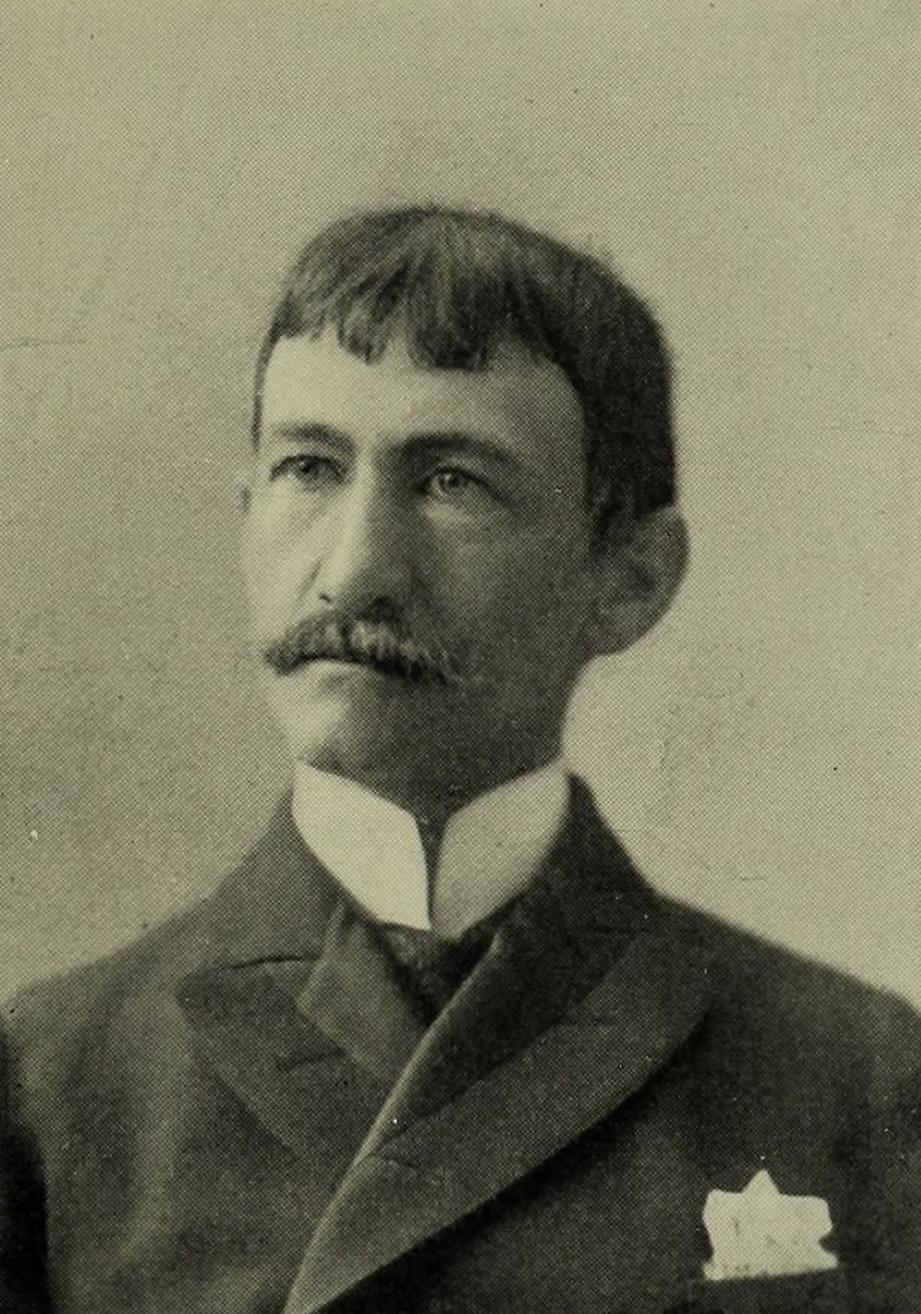
District Judge William Townsend

On 22 August 1900, 36 parties filed claims against CGT in the a US District Court. Their claims totalled more than $1 million. However, on 15 May 1900 CGT had filed a petition for limitation of liability with the United States District Court for the District of Connecticut in New Haven.

In April 1901, claimants asked the District Court to order CGT to provide as evidence La Bourgogne's logbooks for the two years prior to the sinking, and of any other log books from that period for ships on the same route of which Deloncle was Master at the time. On 15 May the District Court granted the order. In October 1901 Judge Townsend heard the case. CGT had not complied with the order, and claimed that it could not produce the logbooks as they "had not been preserved". The District Court rejected CGT's submission as "hearsay". However, the claimants did not pursue the matter further in the case.

On 22 March 1902 Judge Townsend ruled in CGT's favour, finding that the company had properly equipped La Bourgogne with lifeboats and other safety equipment. Townsend found that CGT had provided the correct regulations for its ships to reduce speed in fog, and it was not the company's fault that La Bourgogne had failed to do so. Hence he ruled that claimants could not recover damages for negligence causing loss of life on the high seas. Townsend also granted CGT's petitions to appoint a trustee to whom to transfer CGT's interests in the ship and its pending freight, and a commissioner to receive proof from claimants making claims against CGT.

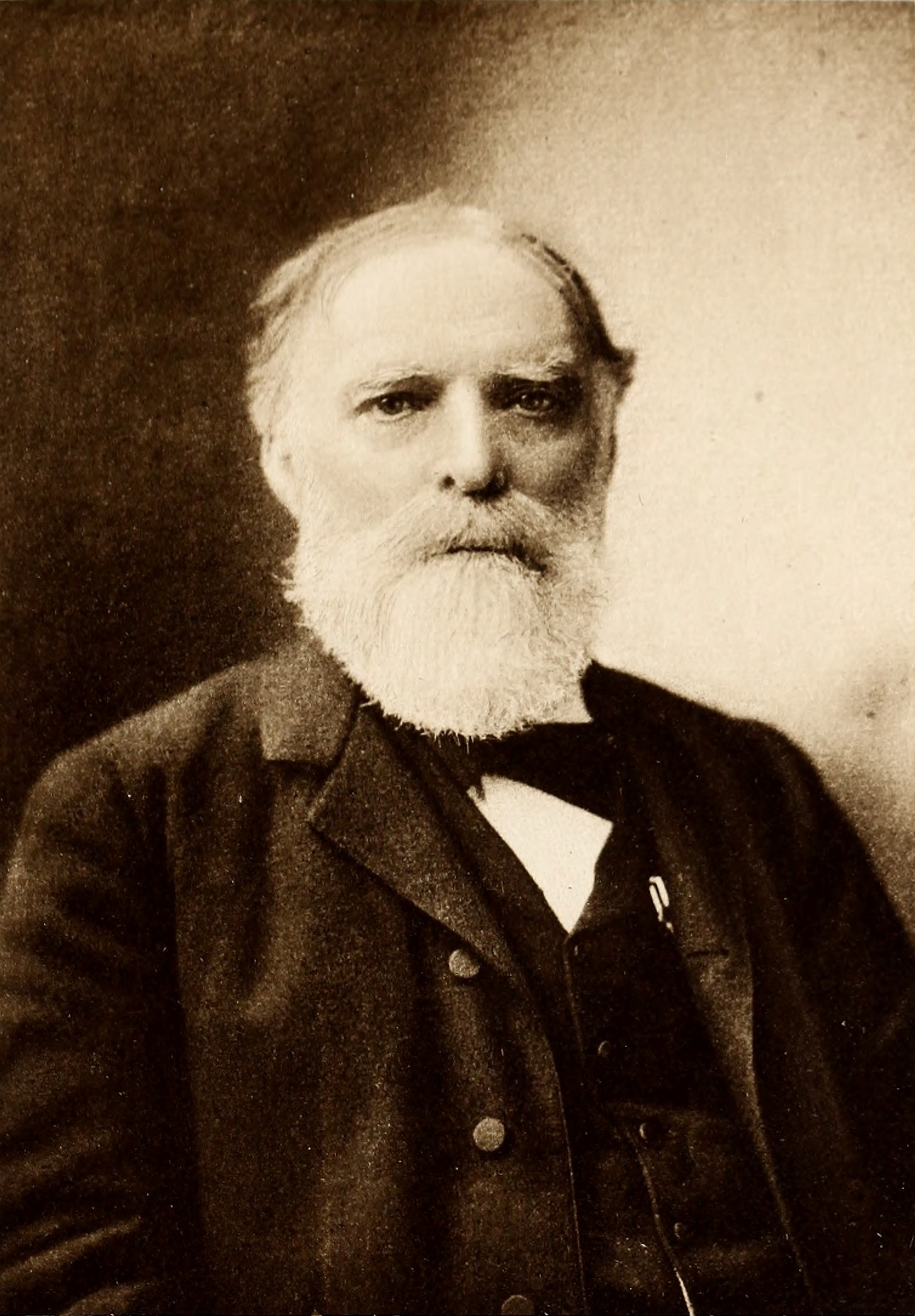
John Forrest Dillon

Judge Dillon, whose wife and daughter were killed in the sinking, told The New York Times that "he did not understand that this decision absolved the company for responsibility for the accident, but that it merely established that the company was not liable under the limited liability statute". He had given up litigation in the case "in disgust long ago. No matter if a hundred courts or men should say that there was no culpability attaching to the company for the loss of that ship, I should know that there was."

La Bourgogne's victims included a US millionaire, T Straus, with his wife and two daughters. He left an estate valued at $4 million, which the US authorities held for want of claimants. On 29 March 1901 his German relatives in Stalluponen, East Prussia (now Nesterov in the Kaliningrad Oblast of Russia), retained counsel to claim his estate.

On 9 May 1904 the commissioner appointed by Judge Townsend submitted his report. He recommended compensation payments to five claimants for the value of money and personal effects that were lost when relatives of theirs were killed in the sinking.

On 27 June 1905 the United States Circuit Court of Appeals fixed CGT's liability at FF 113,419, equivalent to about $35,000. Claimants had been seeking nearly $3 million, and indicated their intention to appeal to the US Supreme Court.

=== US Supreme Court ruling ===
On 18 May 1908 the US Supreme Court found that La Bourgogne was steaming at at least 10 knots (19 km/h), and probably faster; and that this was the proximate cause of the collision. CGT's regulations required that when in fog, its ships must reduce speed, sound fog signals, have a lookout aloft on the foremast, and be ready, if necessary, immediately to further reduce speed or even go astern. The Supreme Court therefore upheld Judge Townsend's ruling that CGT had done all it could to require its captains and deck officers to navigate safely.

The Supreme Court considered whether, despite its published regulations, CGT in fact encouraged or tolerated its ships steaming at excessive speed in fog. It ruled that there was no evidence for this. The French government mail contract required CGT mail ships to maintain an average speed of 15 knots (28 km/h). The government paid CGT a premium for fulfilling the contract, and CGT passed on a small part of that premium to each ship that maintained its contracted average speed. The Supreme Court considered at length whether the contract encouraged masters and officers to maintain excessive speed in fog, and if so, whether CGT knew about it, and was therefore liable. The court refused to believe that a company would take such a risk with its passengers, customers' property, and its own valuable steamships.

US law required La Bourgogne to carry 5,670 cubic feet (161 m^{3}) of lifeboats, plus life rafts, life preservers and other safety devices. She was licensed to carry 1,019 passengers as well as her crew. She in fact carried 6,600 cubic feet (187 m^{3}) of lifeboats, and was carrying only 725 people when she sank. The Supreme Court was therefore satisfied that the ship had enough lifeboats.

The Supreme Court upheld the District Court's decision to grant limitation of liability to CGT, which therefore limited how much money could be awarded to each of the claimants against CGT. It ordered each side in the case to pay their own costs.

== See also ==
- Sinking of the RMS Empress of Ireland, after a collision with a ship in heavy fog.
- Women and children first

== Bibliography ==
- Ashjian, Arten (1999). 19th Century Pioneer Armenian Churchmen in America: Profiles of the First Ten (1889–1899). Diocese of the Armenian Church of America.
- "George Deslions v. La Compagnie Generale Transatlantique". 210 U.S. 95. US (210): 95. 18 May 1908 – via OpenJurist.
- "Loss of the French Liner La Bourgogne With 550 Lives". Marine Engineering. 2 (August). New York: Marine Publishing Company: 24–25. 1898 – via Google Books.
- Middlemiss, Norman (2007). French Line. Merchant Fleets. Vol. 30. Gateshead: Shield Publications Ltd. ISBN 978-1-871128-27-7.
