= SS La Bourgogne =

French transatlantic liner that sank in 1898

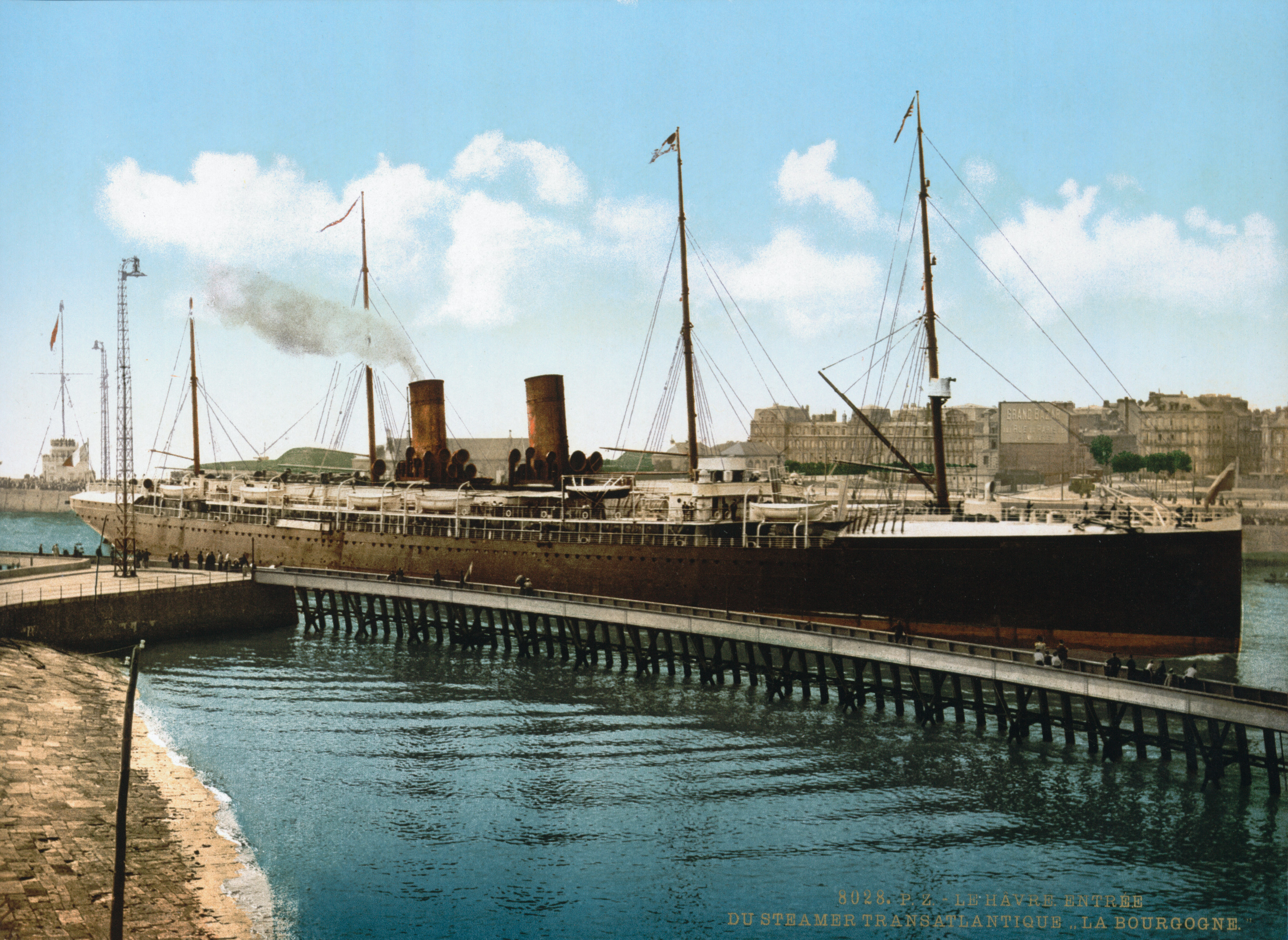
- Photochrom postcard of La Bourgogne entering Le Havre

History

France
- Name: La Bourgogne
- Namesake: Burgundy
- Owner: Cie Gle Transatlantique
- Port of registry: Le Havre
- Route: Le Havre – New York
- Builder: F&C de la Méditerranée, La Seyne
- Cost: FF 7,300,000
- Launched: 8 October 1885
- Completed: May 1886
- Maiden voyage: 19 June 1886
- Refit: 1897
- Identification: Code letters HNLM
- Fate: Sunk by collision, 1898

General characteristics
- Type: Ocean liner
- Tonnage: 7,395 GRT, 2,907 NRT
- Length: 508 ft (155 m) overall; 494.4 ft (150.7 m) registered
- Beam: 52.2 ft (15.9 m)
- Depth: 34.8 ft (10.6 m)
- Decks: 3
- Installed power: 1886: 1,308 NHP; 1897: 1,048 NHP
- Propulsion: 1 × screw; 1886: 2 × compound engines; 1897: 2 × quadruple-expansion engines
- Sail plan: 1886: 4 masts; see text for details; 1897: 2 masts
- Speed: 1886: 17 1/2 knots (32 km/h); 1897: 18 knots (33 km/h)
- Capacity: passengers: 1886: 225 × 1st class, 72 × 2nd class, 900 × 3rd class; 1897: 3rd class increased to 1,500
- Crew: 222
- Notes: sister ships: La Champagne, La Gascoigne, La Bretagne

SS La Bourgogne was a Compagnie Générale Transatlantique (CGT) ocean liner and mail ship that was launched in France in 1886. When new, she set a record for the fastest westbound transatlantic crossing from Le Havre to New York.

The La Bourgogne was sunk by collision with the sailing ship Cromartyshire. The two ships were in thick fog off Newfoundland, and Cromartyshire had reduced speed, but La Bourgogne was steaming at high speed. Only 13 percent of her passengers survived, compared with 48 percent of her crew. 200 of her passengers were women, but only one survived. Passengers included numerous children, none of whom survived. Until the sinking of RMS Titanic in April 1912, almost fourteen years later, it was considered the worst maritime disaster of the North Atlantic Ocean.

== Building ==
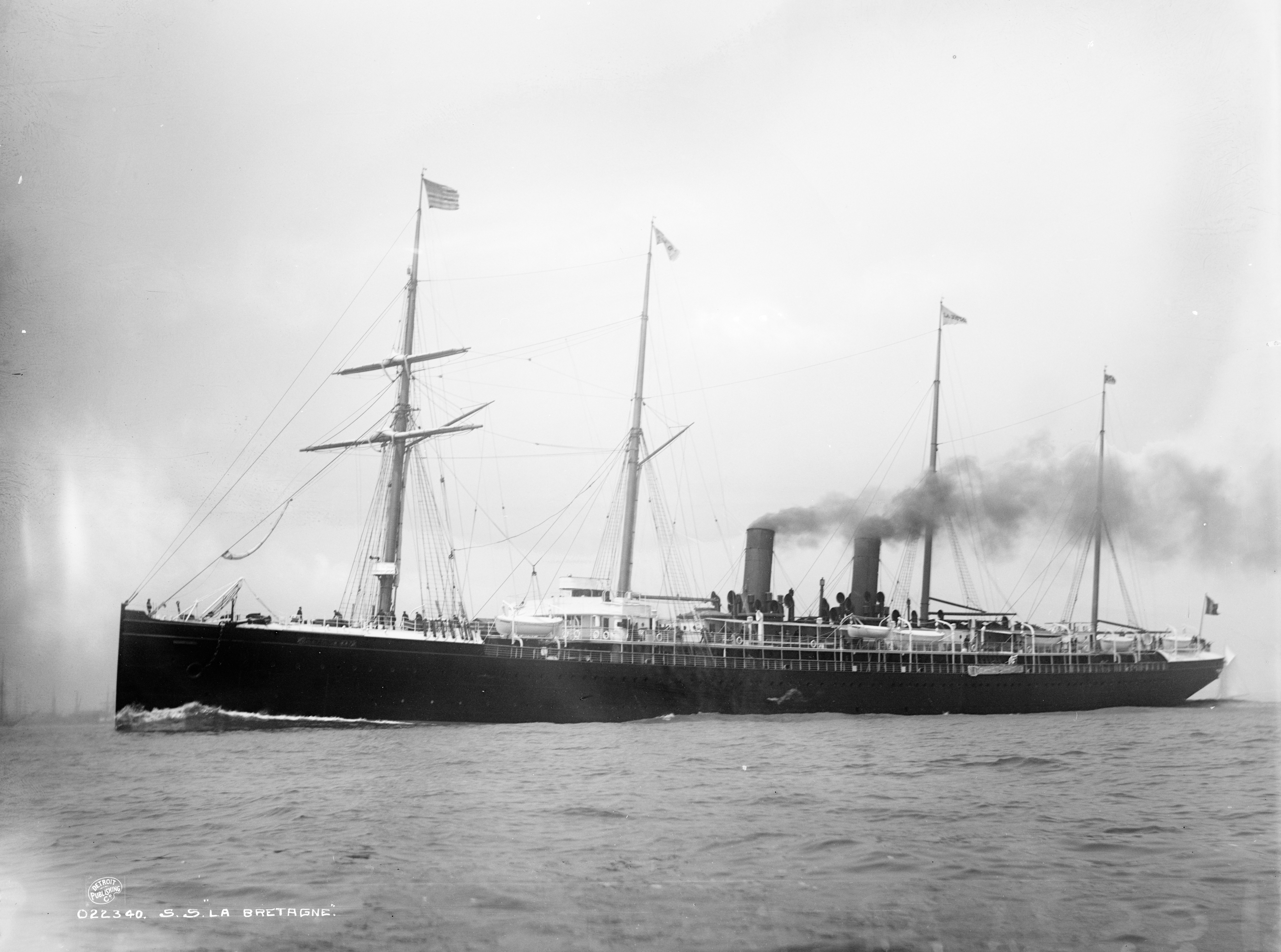
La Bretagne, one of La Bourgogne's sister ships, as built, with four masts, and yards on her foremast

In 1885 and 1886 the CGT took delivery of a class of four new ocean liners. They were for its transatlantic route between Le Havre and New York, which the French Ministry of Posts and Telegraphs subsidised to provide a mail service. The four ships are named after French provinces. Ateliers et Chantiers de Saint-Nazaire Penhoët in Saint-Nazaire built La Champagne, La Gascogne, and La Bretagne. La Bourgogne (French name for Burgundy) was unique, being the only member of the class built by Société Nouvelle des Forges et Chantiers de la Méditerranée in La Seyne-sur-Mer.

La Bourgogne was built partly of iron and partly of steel. She was launched on 8 October 1885 and completed in May 1886, at a cost of FF 7,300,000. Her lengths were 508 ft (155 m) overall and 494.4 ft (150.7 m) registered. Her beam was 52.2 ft (15.9 m) and her depth was 34.8 ft (10.6 m). Her tonnages were 7,395 GRT and 2,907 NRT. Her hull had 10 or 11 transverse bulkheads (sources differ), and a double bottom with ballast tanks with a capacity of 650 tons.

As built, her first class accommodation had berths for 225 passengers in 85 state rooms. Second class had berths for 72 passengers in 12 cabins. Third class or steerage had berths for 900 people. Her public rooms included a first class grand parlour 49 feet (15 m) square, lit by a skylight. She carried 12 lifeboats. All four members of the class, including La Bourgogne, were designed so that they could be armed with guns as armed merchant cruisers.

Like her three sister ships, La Bourgogne had a single screw driven by twin engines. The screw had a diameter of 22 ft 8 in (6.91 m), was made partly of bronze, and weighed 26 tons. Her original machinery was a pair of three-cylinder compound engines. Their combined power output was rated at 1,308 NHP. It gave her a speed of 17 1/2 knots (32 km/h) on her sea trials, as the French government contract required. As built, Bourgogne had four metal masts. Her foremast and mainmast were square-rigged with yards, but her mizzen and jigger-mizzen were rigged for fore-and-aft sails only.

CGT registered La Bourgogne at Le Havre. Her code letters were HNLM.

== Prestige ==
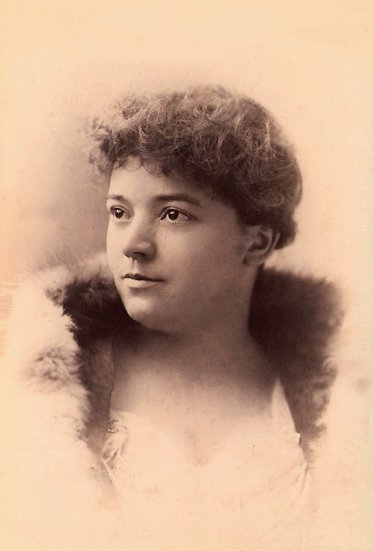
Actress Georgia Cayvan

On her maiden voyage La Bourgogne left Le Havre on the morning of 19 June 1886, and arrived off Sandy Hook, New Jersey on the morning of 26 June, having made the crossing in seven days, 15 hours, and 21 minutes, which set a record from Le Havre to New York.

La Bourgogne's notable passengers included St. Frances Xavier Cabrini in 1889, Roman Catholic Archbishop Michael Corrigan in 1890, organist Alexandre Guilmant and writer Aleko Konstantinov in 1893, and actress Georgia Cayvan in 1894. In 1889 the ship brought Jean-François Millet's oil painting The Angelus across the Atlantic for the American Art Association to exhibit throughout the USA. In 1893 she took $1 million in gold from New York to Europe, including $782,000 for Lazard Frères.

== Collision with Torridon ==
On a westbound crossing in January 1890 La Bourgogne collided in a gale in the English Channel with the British cargo steamship Torridon. The liner badly damaged Torridon's stern, and flooded the forward compartment in her own bow. La Bourgogne put in to St Mary's, Isles of Scilly, to telegraph for help to be sent to the cargo ship. The liner faced more heavy weather during her crossing, and reached New York on 14 January.

== Collisions with Tigre and Alisa ==
On an eastbound crossing on 10 February 1896 La Bourgogne collided with the French steamship Tigre in Havre Roads in heavy fog. Neither ship was seriously damaged.

On 29 February 1896 there were four shipping incidents in fog in and around New York. The tugboat E. S. Atwood was damaged in collision with the ferry Arizona. The Clyde Steamship Company's George W. Clyde was beached at Fort Hamilton to prevent it from sinking after collision with Dominion Line's Guyandotte. American Line's New York grounded in Lower New York Bay. And Atlas Line's steamship Alisa sank after La Bourgogne collided with her in The Narrows.

Alisa had left her pier in the North River at noon, but ran into fog, so at about 13:00 hrs she anchored off Fort Wadsworth to wait for it to clear. At about 14:10 or 14:20 hrs La Bourgogne struck Alisa about 8 feet (2.4 m) aft of the latter's bow, severing the latter's collision bulkhead. Each ship was under the command of a New York pilot at the time. Alisa swiftly developed a list. A dozen of her crew launched one of her lifeboats. Her passengers and some of her crew climbed her rigging. Alisa started to raise her anchor by its steam winch, and at the same time made for the shore of Long Island, but sank in shallow water, with only her masts and the top of her funnel above water. No lives were lost. The tugboat Harold rescued all of Alisa's passengers and crew, and landed them at Battery Park.

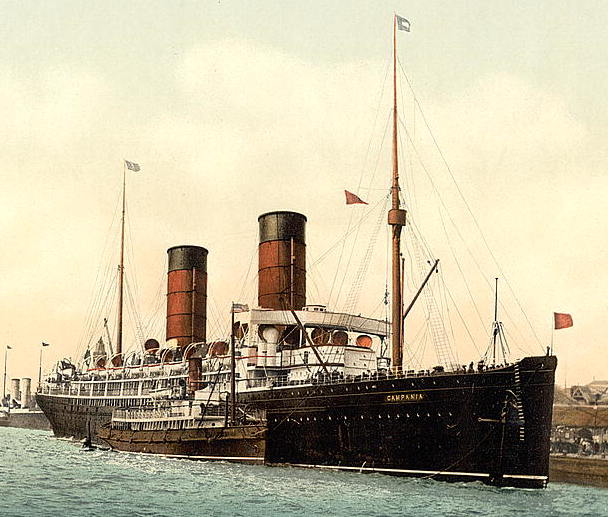
Photochrom image of RMS Campania

One plate of La Bourgogne's starboard bow was damaged, about 15 feet (4.6 m) above the waterline. After the collision she drifted into Gravesend Bay and anchored for the night. A boat transferred her mail to the Cunard Liner RMS Campania, and three of her passengers chose to transfer to the Cunarder as well. La Bourgogne returned to port the next morning, where a plate about 4 by 5 feet (1.2 by 1.5 m) was riveted to her bow as a temporary repair.

On 4 March the Atlas Line filed a lawsuit for $400,000 against La Bourgogne for sinking Alisa. On 21 August a commercial maritime court at Cherbourg, France exonerated La Bourgogne's Master, finding that the collision was a "peril of the sea".

== Rescue from Ernst ==
On 28 July 1896 La Bourgogne sighted a German-owned barque, Ernst. The barque was in ballast, sailing from Caernarfon, Wales to Shediac, New Brunswick. She was leaking, one of her three pumps had failed, and the other two had become blocked. The liner approached Ernst and launched two boats to rescue her crew, but the weather was windy, and there was a heavy sea. This up-ended the first boat, throwing the Chief Officer and two crewmen into the sea, but they were quickly rescued. The heavy sea also made it hazardous to approach the barque. Ernst lowered one of her own boats, from which seven of her crew transferred to La Bourgogne's boats. The barque's other five crewmen jumped into the sea, from which the French boats rescued them. La Bourgogne landed the survivors at Ellis Island on 2 August.

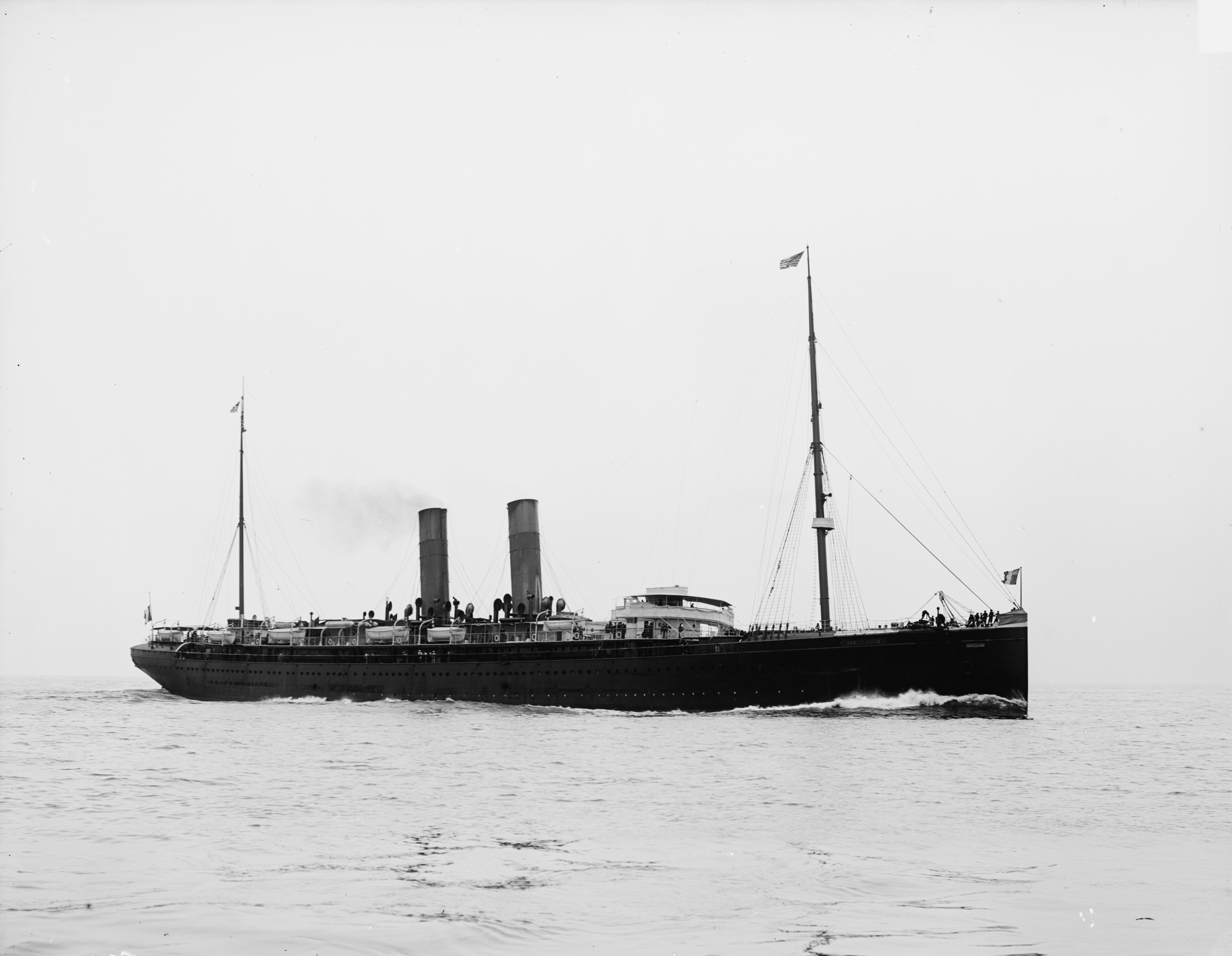
Sister ship La Bretagne after she was refitted in 1895. La Bourgogne would have looked similar after 1897, with her masts reduced from four to two.

== Refit ==
La Bourgogne was refitted in 1897. Her obsolescent compound engines were replaced with a pair of quadruple-expansion engines, built by Ateliers et Chantiers de Saint-Nazaire Penhoët. They were rated at a total of 1,048 NHP, and increased her speed to about 18 knots (33 km/h). She was also given a set of 12 new Scotch boilers, with a working pressure of 160 pounds per square inch (1,100 kPa). Two of her four masts were removed, and the yards were removed from her foremast. Her third class accommodation was increased to 1,500 berths.

== Collision with Cromartyshire and sinking ==
On 2 July 1898 La Bourgogne left the North River in New York for Le Havre. She carried a total of 725 people: 83 passengers in first class, 123 in second, 297 in steerage, and 222 crew. She also carried cargo worth $300,000 to $400,000, and 170 bags of mail. Her passengers included a party of Austro-Hungarian seamen, and a party of about 75 Armenians, including a priest, and 13 Assyrians.

Two days later La Bourgogne ran into dense fog off the Grand Banks of Newfoundland, reducing visibility to about 20 yards (18 metres), but maintained high speed. Also, she was 160 nautical miles (300 km) off the eastbound transatlantic shipping lane on which she should have been.

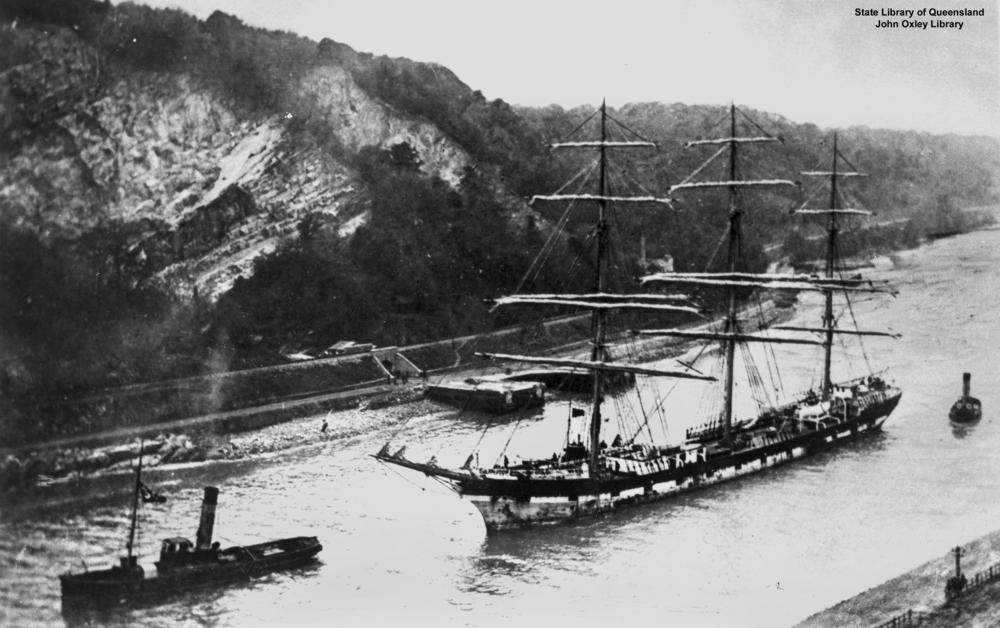
Cromartyshire

On 8 June the three-masted, iron-hulled sailing ship Cromartyshire had left Dunkirk with a cargo of coal for Philadelphia. Early on the morning of 4 July she was sailing through fog, about 60 nautical miles (110 km) off Cape Sable Island, Newfoundland, sounding her foghorn every minute. She was under reduced sail and was making only about 4 to 5 knots (7 to 9 km/h). La Bourgogne heard Cromartyshire's foghorn, and answered with her steam whistle, but neither ship's lookouts could see the other ship. At 05:00 hrs Cromartyshire's bow struck the starboard side of La Bourgogne at an oblique angle. The sailing ship's Master, Captain Oscar Henderson, said the steamship was going at "terrific speed".

The impact was just abaft La Bourgogne's bridge. The sailing ship's bow penetrated the steamship's engine room below the waterline and raked her starboard side, smashing La Bourgogne's starboard lifeboat number 1, and damaging lifeboats numbers 3 and 5. Captain Deloncle set course for Cape Sable Island, but La Bourgogne lost steam, rendering her unable to work her main pumps. La Bourgogne fired a distress rocket and flare, and raised lights to indicate she was in danger.

Most of the passengers were in bed and asleep until the two ships collided. La Bourgogne's starboard lifeboats and some liferafts were launched, but survivors alleged that the liner's officers were ineffective, and the ratings sought to save themselves rather than the passengers. Some passengers resorted to trying to launch boats and rafts themselves, and alleged afterward that some members of the crew "chased them away" and took the boats and rafts for themselves. One passenger alleged that a crewman on deck used an oar to beat a passenger to prevent him from reaching a liferaft. He and other passengers alleged that occupants of lifeboats used boat hooks and oars to stop passengers in the water from boarding their boat. One passenger alleged that he and his elderly mother were thrown out of a lifeboat into the sea. One survivor alleged that some passengers were threatened with knives. Survivors said that the only member of La Bourgogne's crew who made a professional effort to launch lifeboats was the Second Officer, Delinge.

Captain Henderson ordered Cromartyshire's crew to prepare her boats to be lowered, and went forward to inspect her bow. He found extensive damage, but the sailing ship was not in immediate danger of sinking. The two ships lost each other in the fog, but Henderson saw the rocket and flare that La Bourgogne fired, and he had several distress rockets and flares fired from Cromartyshire. At about 05:30 hrs the fog thinned enough for Henderson to see two of La Bourgogne's lifeboats being rowed toward his ship. This was the first he knew that the steamship had sunk.

Cromartyshire rescued the occupants of the two boats, stood to, and launched its own three boats to rescue other survivors, many of them on life rafts or clinging to wreckage. At about 15:00 hrs she sighted a westbound steamship, Allan Line's SS Grecian, and signalled to her. Survivors were transferred to Grecian, which towed the sailing ship to Halifax, Nova Scotia, where they arrived on 6 July.

Only 163 people survived. La Bourgogne's passengers included about 200 women, but only one was saved. The survivors included 104 of 222 crew, but only 61 of 503 passengers. Most of the first class passengers were also killed. The Captain Deloncle, all of the deck officers, and most of the engineer officers died in the sinking.

Survivors described the conduct of Deloncle and his officers. One of Le Bourgogne's stokers claimed that they all acted correctly, but were impeded by some of the passengers. However, Charles Liebra, from Philadelphia, said that Deloncle told the "saloon passengers" (i.e. first class) that there was no danger. An Austro-Hungarian passenger, Matteo Turich, was on deck and saw the collision as it happened. He alleged "No commands were being given and no system prevailed". A Swiss passenger, Fred Nyffeler, also alleged that just after the collision, an officer told him "nothing" was wrong. Nyffeler alleged that as the ship listed, and passengers and crew made for the lifeboats, Deloncle "had evidently lost his head, and was walking up and down the bridge screaming and swearing".

CGT was quick to deny the allegations against its officers and ratings. It claimed they had acted correctly, and that the seamen who assaulted passengers had been travelling in steerage, and were not members of the ship's crew. CGT claimed that the Chief Officer commanded starboard boat number 7, which was full of women and children, and was successfully launched, but was then crushed by one of the ship's two funnels falling upon it. The French Consul-General in New York, Edmond Bruwaert, reported that starboard boat number 9 had conveyed 53 survivors to Cromartyshire, and its crew had then done all they could to rescue other survivors. It was later clarified that they were from Dalmatia and Croatia, which then were provinces of Austria-Hungary.

== Aftermath ==
Survivors of La Bourgogne's crew were returned to New York, where Bruwaert questioned them. On 9 July the crew, along with about a dozen of the surviving steerage passengers, were sent to France aboard the CGT liner La Touraine. On arrival in France they were to be surrendered to the French Admiralty for further questioning. They reached Le Havre aboard La Touraine on 17 July.

Before the end of July a funeral for the victims of the sinking was held at La Madeleine, Paris. The congregation included the French foreign minister, minister of commerce, numerous senators and deputies, and Admiral Jules de Cuverville, who had been Deloncle's commanding officer when he was in the French Navy.

Days before the funeral, Rowland Strong, The New York Times correspondent in Paris, attacked the whole Deloncle family. He called them "a hysterical, half-witted set, and personally I should never have cared to trust my life or property to any one of them. Louis Deloncle... used to boast of his skill in manoeuvring a ship, which, to judge from the accounts of his own friends and his surviving brother, principally consisted in threatening to run down any vessel that came in his way. "Je pass ou je tire dessus". In other words, "I mean to pass or I will fire," was the remark he made when navigating the Normandie through the crush of vessels at the great naval review held last year at Portsmouth in honor of the Queen's jubilee. Only a madman could have given expression to such an intention."

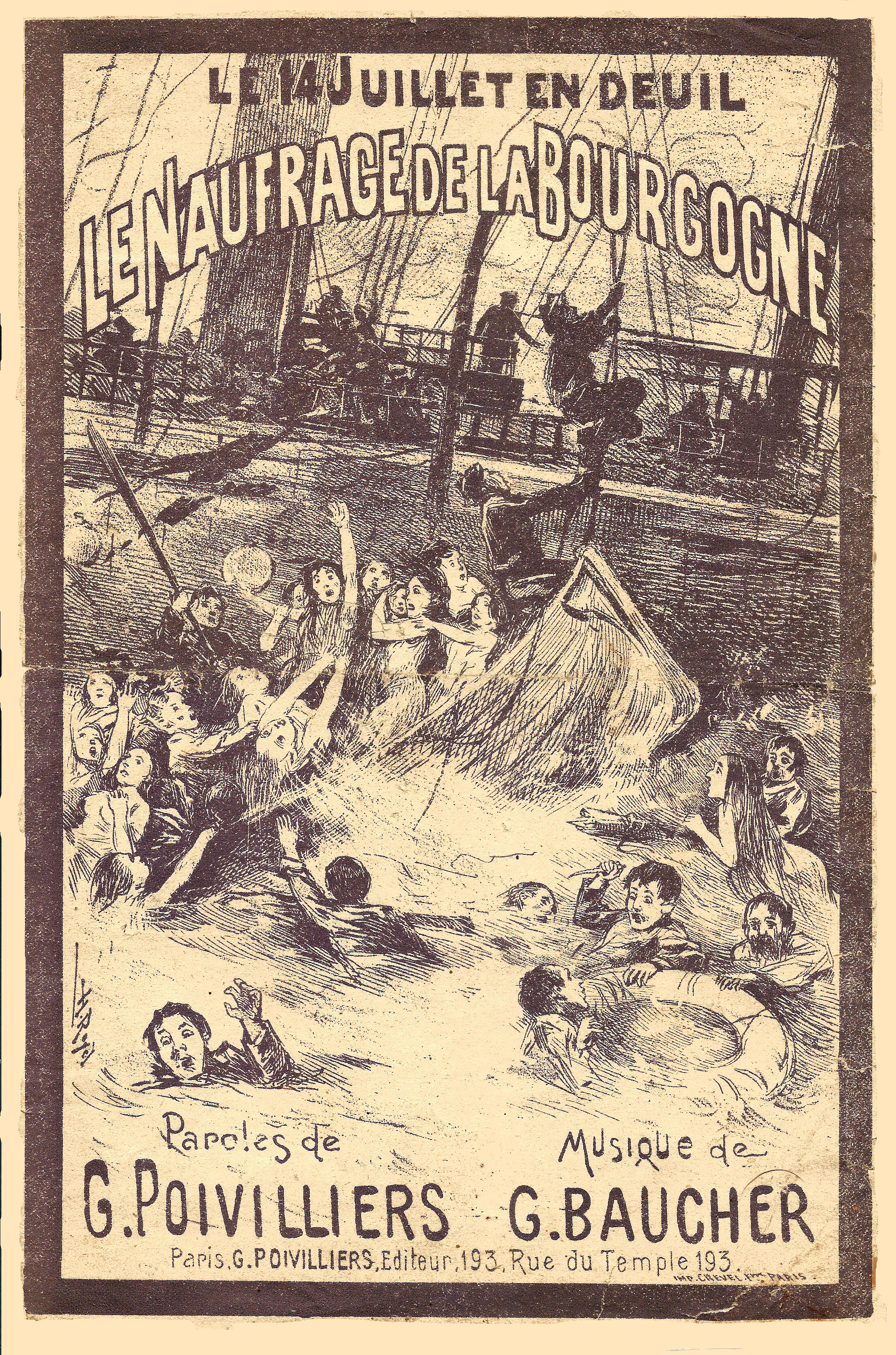
Cover of a song, Le Naufrage de La Bourgogne, published after the sinking

Seafarers reported seeing bodies, apparently from La Bourgogne, floating in the area up to two months after the sinking. On 6 August the Master of the schooner Florence reported finding the body of a man floating at position 43°28′N 59°55′W. In his clothing was the passport of one of La Bourgogne's cabin passengers, Dr Candido Diaz, and a draft for FF 215,000. On 22 August the Master of the Hamburg America Line steamship Christiania reported passing two bloated bodies floating face down at position 43°N 60°W. One was a man wearing a life belt, and the other was apparently a woman. On 2 September the Master of the fishing schooner William H. Cross reported that he and his crew picked up the body of a man. They recovered money, drafts, and other papers of value from the body, and then weighted it and buried it at sea.

=== Legal cases ===
A panel made up of the Wreck Commissioner at Halifax and two other sea captains investigated the collision on behalf of the Canadian government. Their report, published by 29 July, exonerated Cromartyshire's Master and officers. They found that La Bourgogne was not following the sea lane indicated on the nautical chart for that part of the North Atlantic, and was steaming at great speed. They found that had Captain Deloncle "adopted the rules laid down... his vessel could not have been in the position indicated by the disaster". Further, the panel reported that "many of the principal steamship companies do not follow the routes laid down and assented to by all the parties in interest and apparent good faith."

Cromartyshire's owner sued CGT in the Admiralty Division of the High Court of Justice in London for the damage to his ship. CGT sought to quash the writ on the grounds that it was a foreign corporation. On 9 August 1898 Francis Jeune, President of the Admiralty Division, ruled that the English court has jurisdiction, and he rejected CGT's plea. On 12 January 1899 the Admiralty Division found in Cromartyshire's favour and awarded her owners damages and costs. The court found that La Bourgogne was sailing at excessive speed, which was why the sailing ship's bow raked so far along the steamship's side. This ruptured more than one of her bulkheads, causing her to list and then sink relatively quickly. It also damaged her starboard lifeboats, and the list so far to starboard prevented her port boats from being lowered.

Relatives of the dead also sued CGT. 15 lawsuits were begun in New York, and by 24 August claimants were considering whether to transfer proceedings to London, or to Paris. One New York widower sued CGT for $30,000 for the death of his wife.

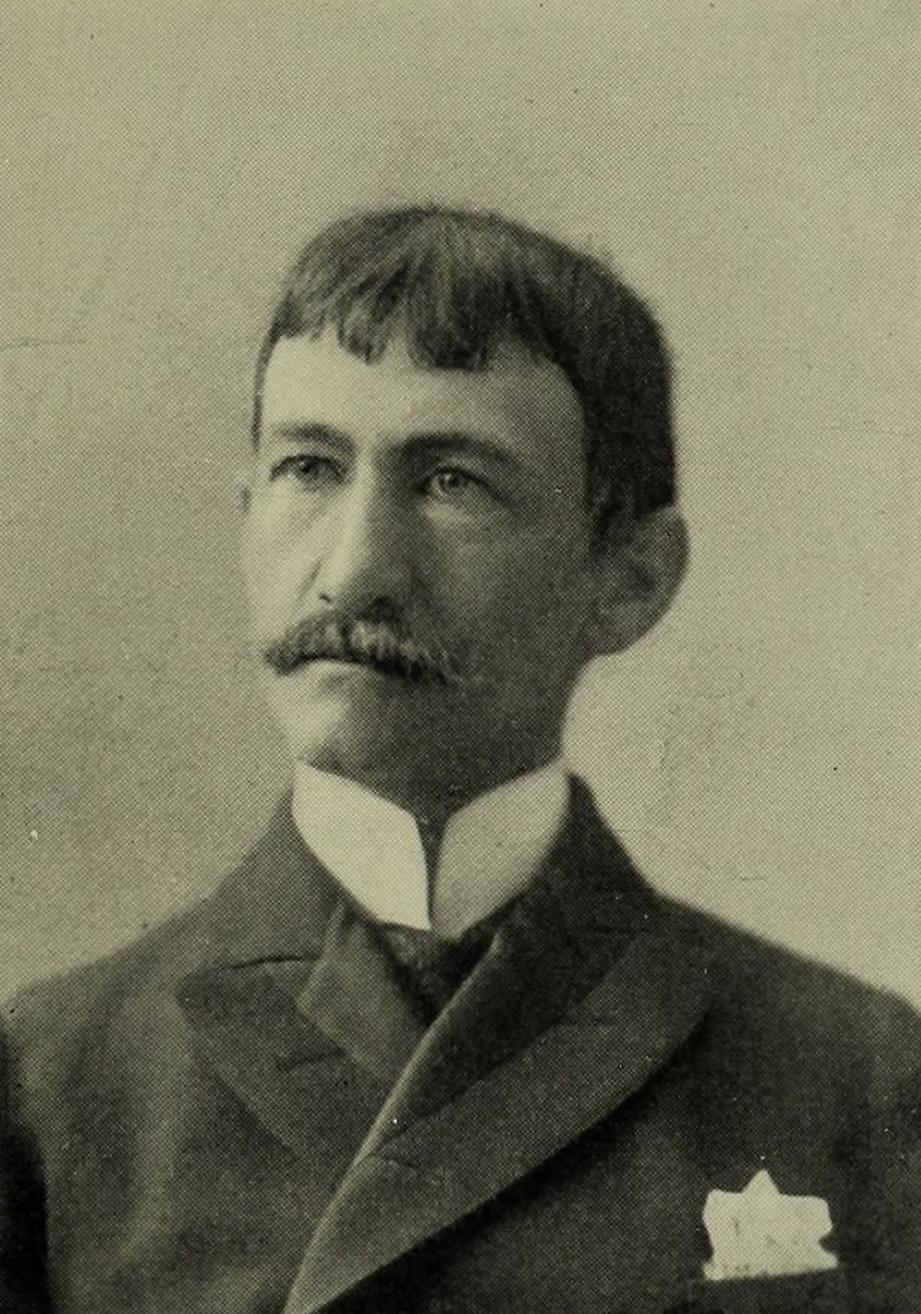
District Judge William Townsend

On 22 August 1900, 36 parties filed claims against CGT in the a US District Court. Their claims totalled more than $1 million. However, on 15 May 1900 CGT had filed a petition for limitation of liability with the United States District Court for the District of Connecticut in New Haven.

In April 1901, claimants asked the District Court to order CGT to provide as evidence La Bourgogne's logbooks for the two years prior to the sinking, and of any other log books from that period for ships on the same route of which Deloncle was Master at the time. On 15 May the District Court granted the order. In October 1901 Judge William Kneeland Townsend heard the case. CGT had not complied with the order, and claimed that it could not produce the logbooks as they "had not been preserved". The District Court rejected CGT's submission as "hearsay". However, the claimants did not pursue the matter further in the case.

On 22 March 1902 Judge Townsend ruled in CGT's favour, finding that the company had properly equipped La Bourgogne with lifeboats and other safety equipment. Townsend found that CGT had provided the correct regulations for its ships to reduce speed in fog, and it was not the company's fault that La Bourgogne had failed to do so. Hence he ruled that claimants could not recover damages for negligence causing loss of life on the high seas. Townsend also granted CGT's petitions to appoint a trustee to whom to transfer CGT's interests in the ship and its pending freight, and a commissioner to receive proof from claimants making claims against CGT.

On 9 May 1904 the commissioner appointed by Judge Townsend submitted his report. He recommended compensation payments to five claimants for the value of money and personal effects that were lost when relatives of theirs were killed in the sinking.

On 27 June 1905 the United States Circuit Court of Appeals fixed CGT's liability at FF 113,419, equivalent to about $35,000. Claimants had been seeking nearly $3 million, and indicated their intention to appeal to the US Supreme Court.

On 18 May 1908 the US Supreme Court found that La Bourgogne was steaming at at least 10 knots (19 km/h), and probably faster; and that this was the proximate cause of the collision. CGT's regulations required that when in fog, its ships must reduce speed, sound fog signals, have a lookout aloft on the foremast, and be ready, if necessary, immediately to further reduce speed or even go astern. The Supreme Court therefore upheld Judge Townsend's ruling that CGT had done all it could to require its captains and deck officers to navigate safely.

The Supreme Court upheld the District Court's decision to grant limitation of liability to CGT, which therefore limited how much money could be awarded to each of the claimants against CGT. It ordered each side in the case to pay their own costs.

== Wreck ==
The wreck of La Bourgogne has not yet been discovered but is believed to be lying around 70 miles off the coast of Sable Island, Nova Scotia.

== Bibliography ==
- Ashjian, Arten (1999). 19th Century Pioneer Armenian Churchmen in America: Profiles of the First Ten (1889–1899). Diocese of the Armenian Church of America.
- Bowen, Frank (1930). A century of Atlantic travel, 1830–1930. Boston: Little, Brown and Company.
- "George Deslions v. La Compagnie Generale Transatlantique". 210 U.S. 95. US (210): 95. 18 May 1908 – via OpenJurist.
- Lloyd's Register of British & Foreign Shipping. Vol. II.–Sailing Vessels. London: Lloyd's Register of Shipping. 1896 – via Internet Archive.
- Lloyd's Register of British & Foreign Shipping. Vol. I.–Steamers. London: Lloyd's Register of Shipping. 1897 – via Internet Archive.
- Lloyd's Register of British & Foreign Shipping. Vol. I.–Steamers. London: Lloyd's Register of Shipping. 1898 – via Internet Archive.
- Looker, Janet (2000). "Disgrace". Disaster Canada. Lynx Images. ISBN 1894073134.
- "Loss of the French Liner La Bourgogne With 550 Lives". Marine Engineering. 2 (August). New York: Marine Publishing Company: 24–25. 1898 – via Google Books.
- Middlemiss, Norman (2007). French Line. Merchant Fleets. Vol. 30. Gateshead: Shield Publications Ltd. ISBN 978-1-871128-27-7.
