= Cromartyshire (ship) =

Three masted iron sailing ship built in 1879

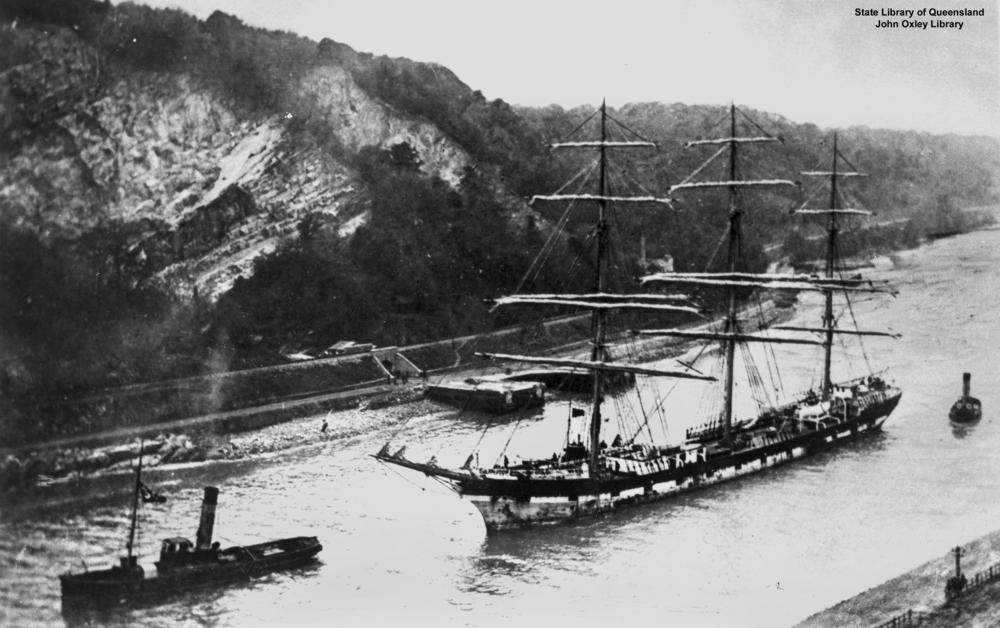
- Cromartyshire under tow in the Avon Gorge

History

United Kingdom
- Name: Cromartyshire
- Namesake: Cromartyshire
- Owner: 1879: Thomas Law & Co; 1883: James Law; 1886: James & William Law; 1893: William Law
- Port of registry: Glasgow
- Builder: Russell & Co, Port Glasgow
- Yard number: 19
- Launched: 6 August 1879
- Completed: August 1879
- Identification: UK official number 82253; code letters SQLV
- Fate: Wrecked, 1906

General characteristics
- Type: cargo ship
- Tonnage: 1,554 GRT, 1,462 NRT
- Length: 248.8 ft (75.8 m)
- Beam: 38.1 ft (11.6 m)
- Depth: 22.8 ft (6.9 m)
- Decks: 1
- Sail plan: 3 masts, full rig
- Notes: iron hull

Cromartyshire was an iron-hulled sailing cargo ship that was launched in Scotland in 1879. She was named after the county of Cromartyshire in the Scottish Highlands.

In 1898, she survived a collision with the French transatlantic liner La Bourgogne, which sank with great loss of life on 4 July. Cromartyshire also survived a fire off Cape Colony in 1901. She was wrecked on the coast of Chile in 1906.

== Building ==
The shipbuilder Russell & Company was founded in 1874 in Port Glasgow on the Firth of Clyde. Its early customers included the Law family of Glasgow, who owned a fleet of sailing ships that they named after shires of Scotland. Between 1879 and 1884 Russell & Co built four iron-hulled, three-masted ships for the Law family.

The first was yard number 19, launched on 6 August 1879 as Cromartyshire. She was followed by yard number 20, launched on 1 November 1879 as Peeblesshire; and yard number 29, launched on 21 September 1880 as Wigtonshire. The fourth was yard number 93, launched on 23 September 1884 as Haddingtonshire. Peeblesshire and Wigtonshire were sister ships, each just over 200 feet (61 m) long. Haddingtonshire was larger, and Cromartyshire was the largest of all.

Cromartyshire's registered length was 248.8 ft (75.8 m), her beam was 38.1 ft (11.6 m), and her depth was 22.8 ft (6.9 m). Her tonnages were 1,554 GRT and 1,462 NRT. She was a full-rigged ship.

== Ownership and registration ==
Cromartyshire's first owners were Thomas Law & Co, who registered her at Glasgow. Her United Kingdom official number was 82253 and her code letters were SQLV. By 1883 her principal owner was listed as James Law. This had changed to James and William Law by 1886, and William Law by 1893.

== Collision with La Bourgogne ==
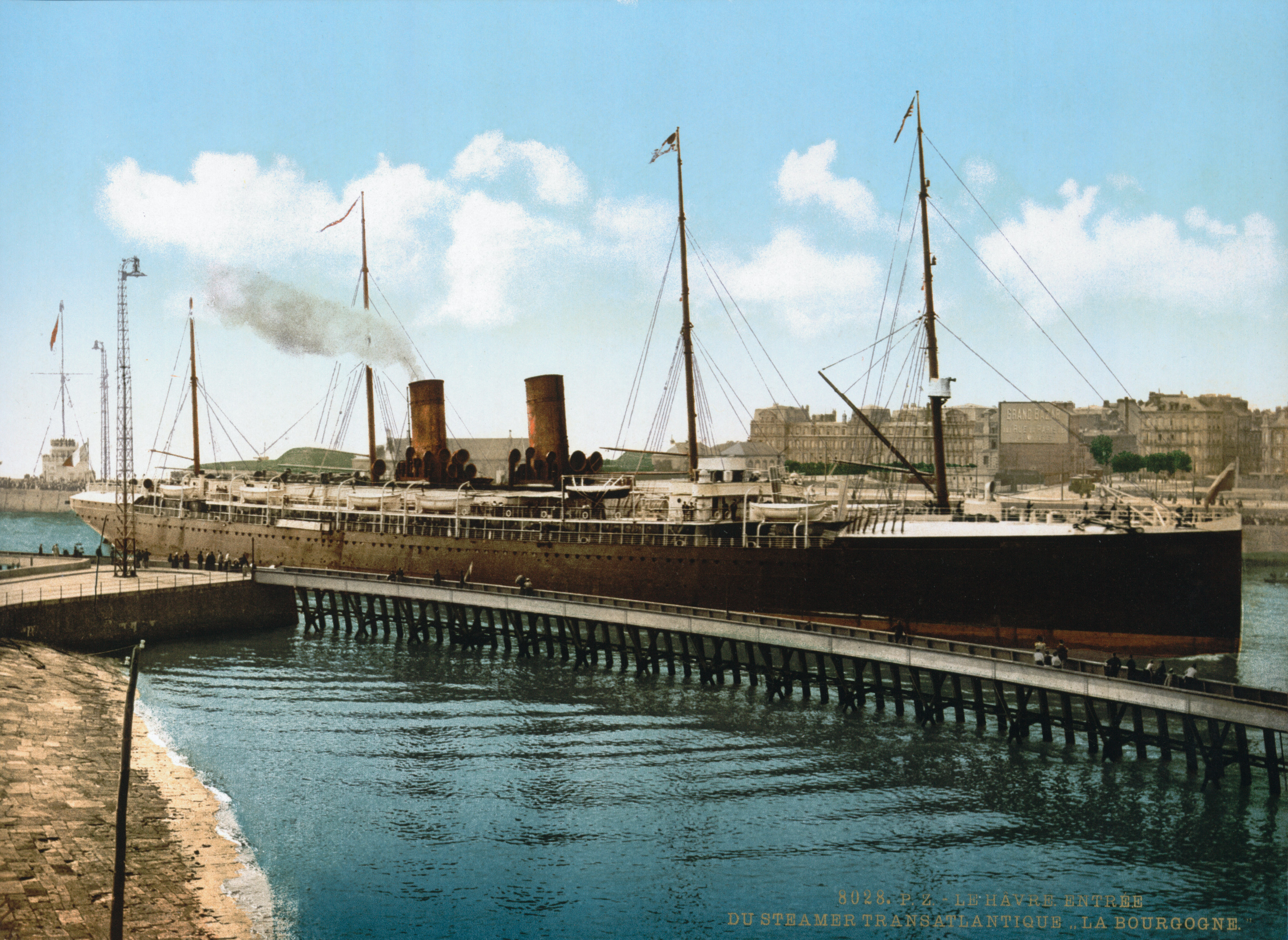
The liner La Bourgogne

On 8 June 1898 Cromartyshire left Dunkirk with a cargo of coal for Philadelphia. Her Master was Captain Oscar Henderson, and his wife and children were travelling with him. On 2 July the Compagnie Générale Transatlantique (CGT) liner La Bourgogne left New York for Le Havre. She carried 503 passengers and 222 crew.

Early on the morning of 4 July Cromartyshire was sailing through fog, about 60 nautical miles (110 km) off Cape Sable Island, Newfoundland. Visibility was only about 20 yards (18 m). She was under reduced sail, making only about 4 to 5 knots (7 to 9 km/h), and sounding her foghorn every minute. On her fo'c'sle she had a seaman as lookout, accompanied by her Chief Officer. Henderson and his Third Officer were on her poop.

La Bourgogne heard Cromartyshire's foghorn, and answered with her steam whistle, but neither ship's lookouts could see the other ship. At 05:00 hrs Cromartyshire's bow struck the starboard side of La Bourgogne at an oblique angle. Captain Henderson said the steamship was going at "terrific speed".

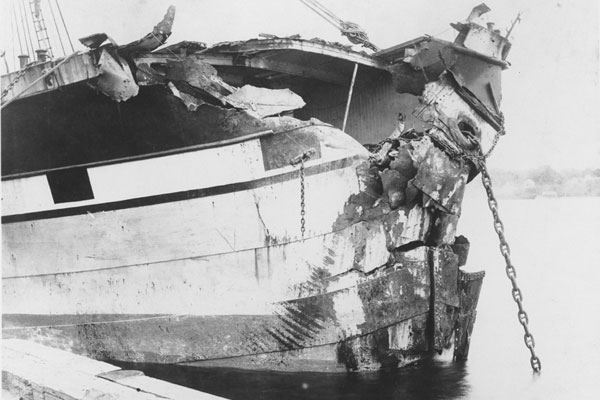
Cromartyshire's damaged bow after colliding with La Bourgogne

Captain Henderson ordered Cromartyshire's crew to prepare her boats to be lowered, and went forward to inspect her bow. The impact had brought down the topmast and main topgallant of Cromartyshire's foremast, and torn off her bow, but the collision bulkhead just abaft her bow was intact. Her starboard anchor was swinging on its chain, and threatened to puncture what was left of her bow. Henderson set his crew to clearing the wreckage. Henderson saw the rocket and flare that La Bourgogne fired, and he had several distress rockets and flares fired from Cromartyshire, but the two ships still could not see each other.

At about 05:30 hrs the fog thinned enough for Henderson to see two of La Bourgogne's lifeboats being rowed toward his ship. This was the first he knew that the steamship had sunk. Cromartyshire rescued the occupants of the two boats, stood to, and launched its own three boats to rescue other survivors, who were found on life rafts or clinging to wreckage. From the 725 people who had been aboard the liner, Cromartyshire found only 163 survivors. At about 15:00 hrs she sighted a westbound steamship, Allan Line's Grecian. The sailing ship raised the signal flags "HC", indicating that she had rescued survivors and needed assistance. Survivors were transferred to Grecian, which at 18:00 hrs took Cromartyshire in tow. They reached Halifax, Nova Scotia on 6 July.

== Legal cases ==
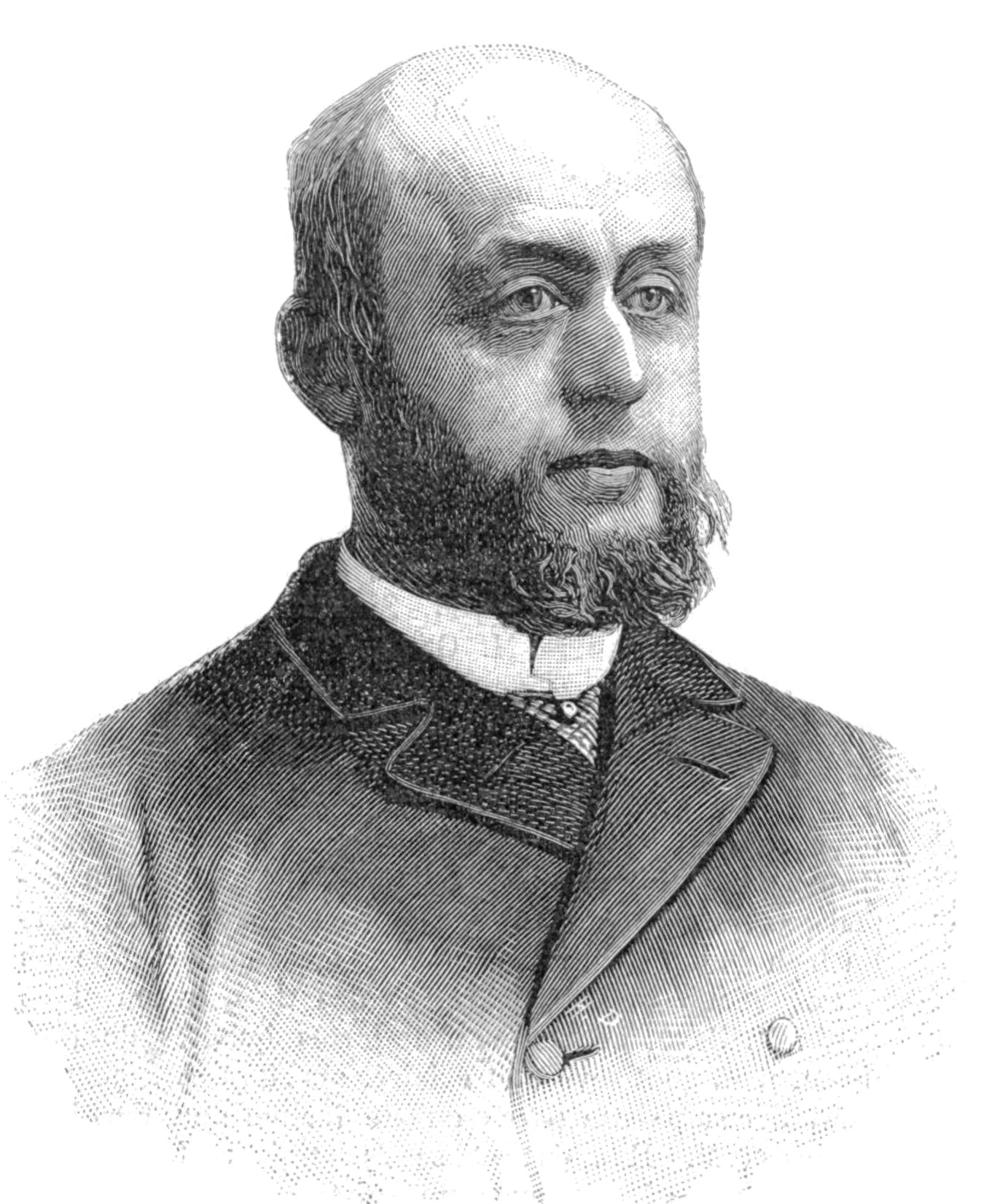
Louis Deloncle, Master of Le Bourgogne

A panel comprising the Wreck Commissioner at Halifax and two other sea captains investigated the collision on behalf of the Canadian government. Their report, published by 29 July 1898, exonerated Captain Henderson and his officers. They found that La Bourgogne was not following the sea lane indicated on the nautical chart for that part of the North Atlantic, and was steaming at great speed. They found that had her Master, Captain Louis Deloncle, "adopted the rules laid down... his vessel could not have been in the position indicated by the disaster". Further, the panel reported that "many of the principal steamship companies do not follow the routes laid down and assented to by all the parties in interest and apparent good faith."

William Law sued CGT in the Admiralty Division of the High Court of Justice in London for the damage to his ship. CGT sought to quash the writ on the grounds that it is a foreign corporation. On 9 August 1898 Francis Jeune, President of the Admiralty Division, ruled that the English court has jurisdiction, and he rejected CGT's plea. On 12 January 1899 the Admiralty Division found in Cromartyshire's favour and awarded William Law damages and costs.

== Later career ==
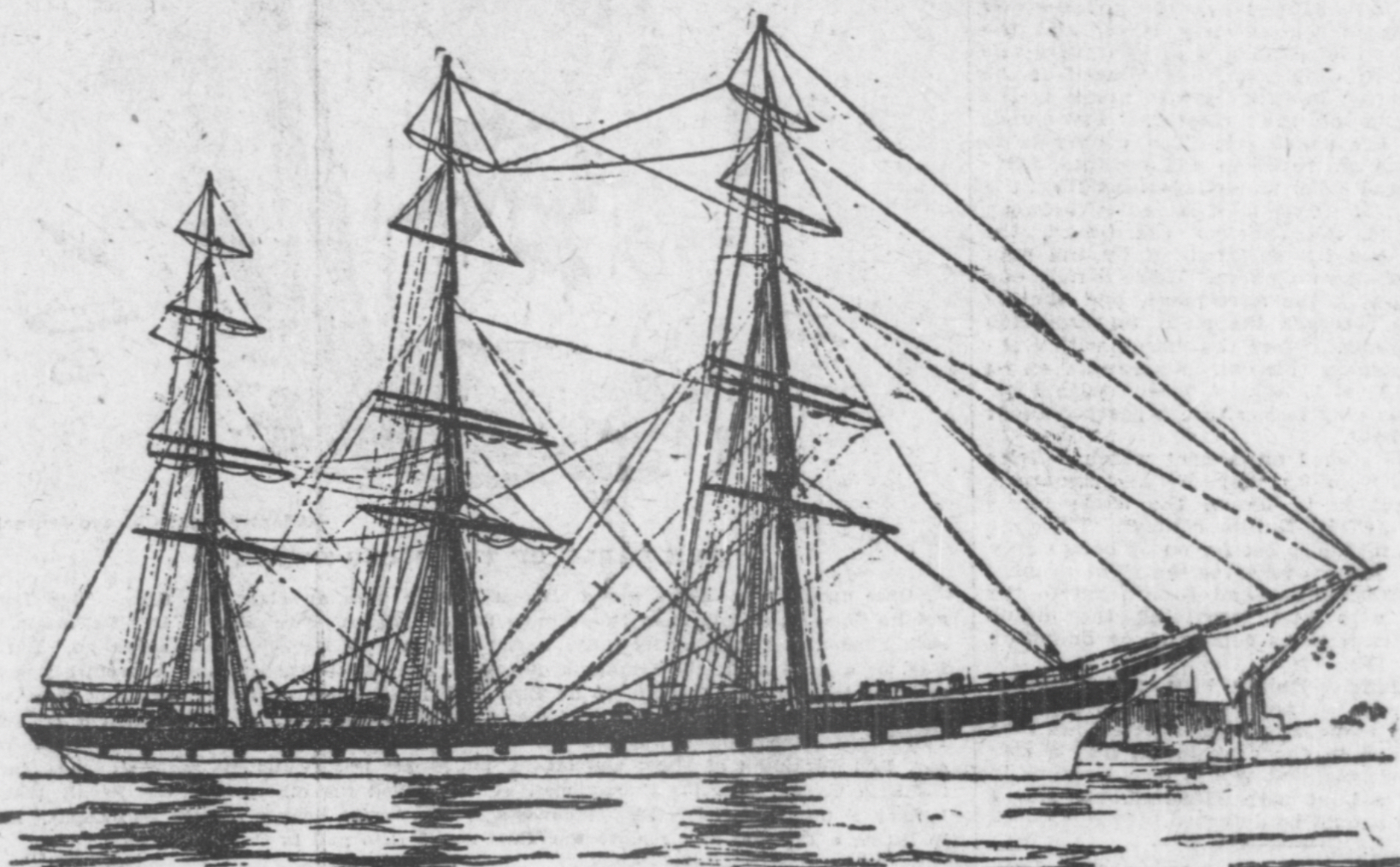
A sketch of Cromartyshire from The Oregonian newspaper in 1900

In 1901 Cromartyshire was sailing from Leith in Scotland to Port Elizabeth in Cape Colony. On 1 September she caught fire off Mossel Bay. Her crew abandoned her, but she stayed afloat, and was later retrieved.

In January 1906 she was sailing from Antwerp in Belgium to Talcahuano in Chile. On 18 January she ran aground off Vlissingen in the Netherlands. She was refloated, discharged her cargo at Vlissingen, and on 12 February reached Middelburg, Zeeland for repairs. She then reloaded her cargo at Vlissingen, and on 27 March left for Chile.

== Wreck ==
On 22 October 1906 Cromartyshire left Antofagasta in northern Chile partly laden. She was to sail north to load further cargo at Iquique, but on 24 October she went ashore and was wrecked. The site of her wreck is recorded as "Tetus Point on Printabu Island", but no headland or island with those names exists. Lloyd's lists the location as "Antofagasta", probably indicating the Province or region instead of the city.

== Bibliography ==
- Lloyd's Register of British & Foreign Shipping. London: Lloyd's Register of Shipping. 1880 – via Internet Archive.
- Mercantile Navy List. London. 1880 – via Crew List Index Project.
- Mercantile Navy List. London. 1883 – via Crew List Index Project.
- Mercantile Navy List. London. 1886 – via Crew List Index Project.
- Mercantile Navy List. London. 1893 – via Crew List Index Project.
