= Austria-Hungary =

1867–1918 dual monarchy in Central Europe

Coordinates: 48°12′27″N 16°21′54″E

Austro-Hungarian Monarchy (Note: Internally: The Kingdoms and Lands Represented in the Imperial Council and the Lands of the Crown of Saint Stephen (the official names of "Cisleithania" or "Austria" and "Transleithania" or "Hungary" respectively)): Österreichisch-Ungarische Monarchie; Osztrák–Magyar Monarchia
- 1867–1918
- Coat of arms (1915–1918) (see also: Flags of Austria-Hungary)
- Motto: Indivisibiliter ac inseparabiliter (Latin for 'Indivisibly and inseparably')
- Anthem: Gott erhalte, Gott beschütze (English: God preserve, God protect)
- The Kingdoms and Lands Represented in the Imperial Council ("Cisleithania" or "Austria") Lands of the Crown of Saint Stephen ("Transleithania" or "Hungary") Condominium of Bosnia-Herzegovina
- Capital and largest city: Vienna (Note: Vienna was the seat of the shared ministries and court of the ruling House of Habsburg and His Imperial and Royal Apostolic Majesty, making it the capital of Austria-Hungary as a single entity. However, the emperor and his court also maintained a regular residency in Bad Ischl, Laxenburg and Baden bei Wien during the final years of the Austro-Hungarian monarchy. It was also simultaneously the capital of Cisleithania. In addition, Budapest was the capital of Transleithania.)
- Official languages: Court language: German; Cisleithania: none (mostly language of the land: German); Transleithania: Hungarian; Croatian (Croatia-Slavonia); Italian (Fiume)
- Common languages: German, Hungarian, Croatian, Czech, Polish, Ruthenian, Romanian, Bosnian, Serbian, Slovak, Slovene, Italian, Romani (Carpathian), Yiddish, and others (Friulian, Istro-Romanian, Istriot, Ladin)
- Religion (1910): 76.6% Catholic (Note: Including 64–66% Latin and 10–12% Eastern); 8.9% Protestant (Note: Lutheran, Reformed, Unitarian); 8.7% Eastern Orthodox; 4.4% Jewish; 1.3% Muslim
- Demonyms: Austrian, Hungarian
- Government: Two constitutional monarchies (Cisleithania and Transleithania) in real union and customs union (dual monarchy) (Note: by Pragmatic Sanction of the House of Habsburg)
- Emperor and King (Note: Imperial and Royal Apostolic Majesty) of Austria and Hungary
  - 1867–1916: Franz Joseph I
  - 1916–1918: Charles I and IV
- Minister-President of Austria
  - 1867 (first): F. F. von Beust
  - 1918 (last): Heinrich Lammasch
- Prime Minister of Hungary
  - 1867–1871 (first): Gyula Andrássy
  - 1918 (last): Mihály Károlyi
- Legislature: Two national legislatures
  - Imperial Council: House of Lords; House of Deputies
  - Diet of Hungary: House of Magnates; House of Representatives
- Historical era: New Imperialism; World War I
  - 1867 Compromise: 30 March 1867
  - Dual Alliance: 7 October 1879
  - Bosnian Crisis: 6 October 1908
  - July Crisis: 28 June 1914
  - Invasion of Serbia: 28 July 1914
  - Empire dissolved: 31 October 1918
  - Austrian Republic: 12 November 1918
  - Hungarian Republic: 16 November 1918
  - Treaty of Saint-Germain: 10 September 1919
  - Treaty of Trianon: 4 June 1920

Area
- 1905: 621,538 km^{2} (239,977 sq mi)

Population
  - 1910 estimate: 51,390,223
- Currency: Gulden / florin (1867–1892); Krone (1892–1918)
Preceded by
Austrian Empire
Bosnia vilayet
Succeeded by
German-Austria
Hungary
Czechoslovakia
State of Slovenes, Croats and Serbs
Kingdom of Yugoslavia
Kingdom of Italy
Polish Liquidation Committee
Kingdom of Poland
West Ukrainian People's Republic

Austria-Hungary, (Note: German: Österreich-Ungarn [ˈøːstəraɪç ˈʊŋɡarn]; Hungarian: Ausztria–Magyarország [ˈɒustrijɒ ˈmɒɟɒrorsaːɡ].) also referred to as the Austro-Hungarian Empire and officially as the Austro-Hungarian Monarchy, (Note: Rarely referred to in English as the Dual Monarchy.) was a multi-national empire in Central Europe (Note: The concept of Eastern Europe is not firmly defined, and depending on the interpretation, some territories may be included or excluded from it; this holds for parts of Austria–Hungary as well, although the historical interpretation clearly places the monarchy in Central Europe.) under a constitutional dual monarchy that existed between 1867 and 1918. A military and diplomatic real union, it consisted of two largely self governing states with a single monarch who was titled both the Emperor of Austria and the Apostolic King of Hungary. Austria-Hungary constituted the last phase in the constitutional evolution of the Habsburg monarchy: it was formed with the Austro-Hungarian Compromise of 1867 in the aftermath of the Austro-Prussian War, following wars of independence by Hungary (primarily Rákóczi's War of Independence of 1703–1711 and the Hungarian Revolution of 1848–1849) in opposition to Habsburg rule. It was dissolved shortly after Hungary terminated the union with Austria in 1918 at the end of World War I.

Austria-Hungary was one of Europe's major powers, and was the second-largest country in Europe in area (after Russia) and the third-most populous (after Russia and the German Empire), while being among the 10 most populous countries worldwide. The Empire built up the fourth-largest machine-building industry in the world. With the exception of the territory of the Bosnian Condominium, the Empire of Austria and the Kingdom of Hungary were separate sovereign countries in international law.

At its core was the dual monarchy, which was a real union between Cisleithania, the northern and western parts of the former Austrian Empire, and Transleithania, which corresponded to the medieval territories of the Kingdom of Hungary. Following the 1867 reforms, the Austrian and Hungarian states were co-equal in power. The two countries conducted unified diplomatic, defence and monetary policies. For these purposes, "common" ministries of foreign affairs and defence were maintained under the monarch's direct authority, as was a third finance ministry responsible only for financing the two "common" portfolios as well as the Austro-Hungarian Bank. A third component of the union was the Kingdom of Croatia-Slavonia, an autonomous region under the Hungarian crown, which negotiated the Croatian–Hungarian Settlement in 1868. After 1878, Bosnia and Herzegovina came under Austro-Hungarian joint military and civilian rule until it was fully annexed in 1908, provoking the Bosnian crisis.

Austria-Hungary was one of the Central Powers in World War I, which began with an Austro-Hungarian war declaration on the Kingdom of Serbia on 28 July 1914. It was already effectively dissolved by the time the military authorities signed the armistice of Villa Giusti on 3 November 1918. The Kingdom of Hungary and the First Austrian Republic were treated as its successors de jure, whereas the independence of the First Czechoslovak Republic, the Second Polish Republic, and the Kingdom of Yugoslavia, respectively, and most of the territorial demands of the Kingdom of Romania and the Kingdom of Italy were also recognized by the victorious powers in 1920.

== Name and terminology ==
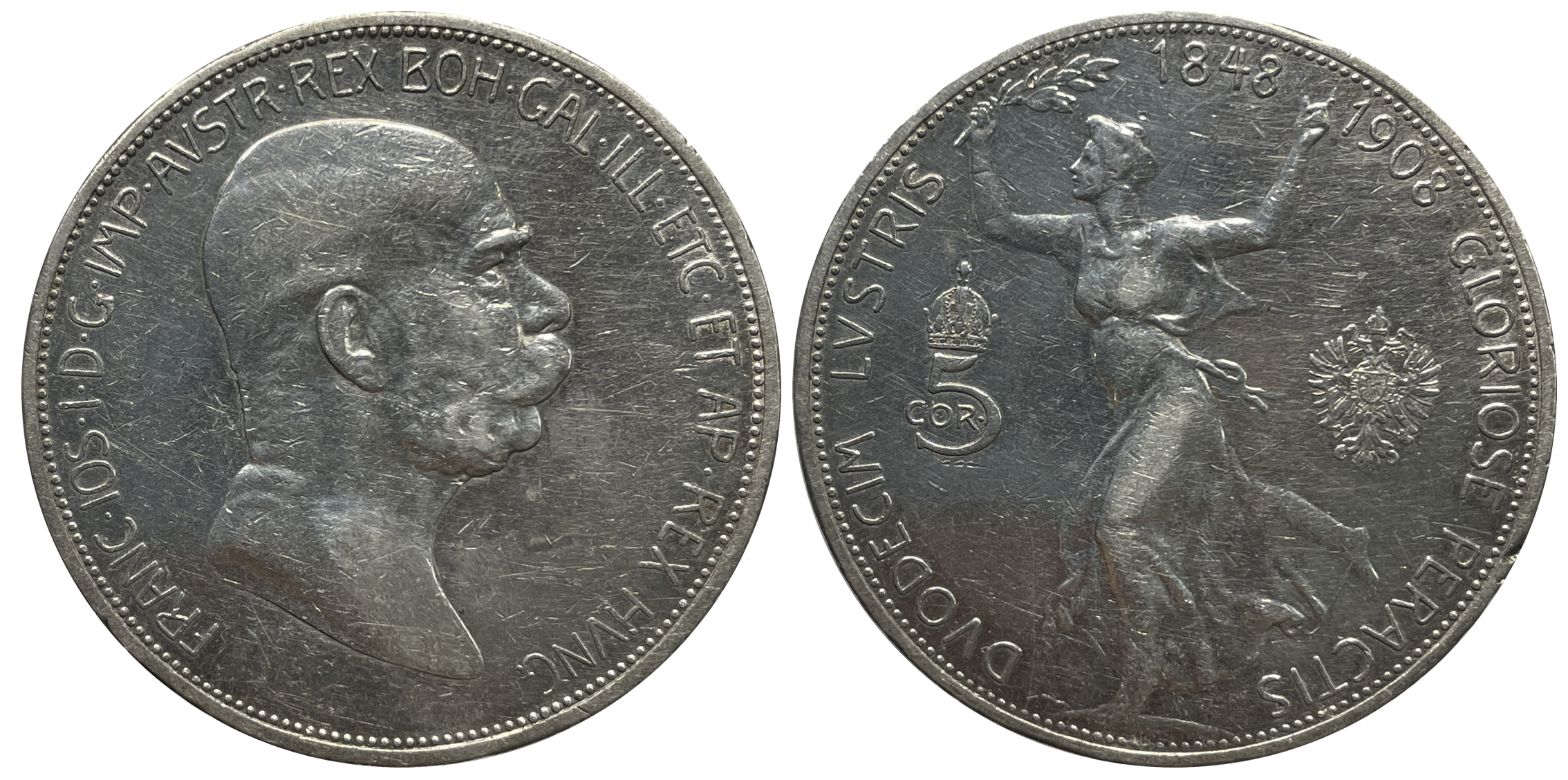
Silver coin: 5 corona, 1908 – the bust of Franz Joseph I facing right surrounded by the abbreviated legend "FRANC[iscus] IOS[ephus] I, D[ei] G[ratia], IMP[erator] AUSTR[iae], REX BOH[emiae], GAL[iciae], ILL[yriae], ETC, ET AP[ostolicus] REX HUNG[ariae]"

The dual monarchy has been anachronistically often called simply Austria, referring to the main hereditary lands of the ruling Austrian Habsburgs and particularly to the Austrian Empire, which the dual monarchy emerged from.

The realm's full name used in internal administration was The Kingdoms and Lands Represented in the Imperial Council and the Lands of the Holy Hungarian Crown of St. Stephen

- German: Die im Reichsrat vertretenen Königreiche und Länder und die Länder der Heiligen Ungarischen Stephanskrone
- Hungarian: A Birodalmi Tanácsban képviselt királyságok és országok és a Magyar Szent Korona országai

Following a decision of Franz Joseph I in 1868, the realm bore internationally the official name Austro-Hungarian Monarchy (German: Österreichisch-Ungarische Monarchie, IPA: [ˈøːstəʁaɪçɪʃ ˈʊŋɡaʁɪʃə monaʁˈçiː]; Hungarian: Osztrák–Magyar Monarchia, IPA: [ˈostraːk ˈmɒɟɒr ˈmonɒrɦijɒ]).

Other occasionally used names were the Dual Monarchy (German: Doppel-Monarchie; Hungarian: Dual-Monarchia), The Double Eagle (German: Der Doppel-Adler; Hungarian: Kétsas) or the Danubian Monarchy (German: Donaumonarchie; Hungarian: Dunai Monarchia), but none of these became widespread either in Hungary or elsewhere.

=== k. u. k. monarchy ===
The state used internally the names k. u. k. Monarchie (English: k. u. k. monarchy) (in detail German: Kaiserliche und königliche Monarchie Österreich-Ungarn; Hungarian: Császári és Királyi Osztrák–Magyar Monarchia).

From 1867 onwards, the abbreviations heading the names of official institutions in Austria–Hungary reflected their responsibility:

- k. u. k. (kaiserlich und königlich or Imperial and Royal) was the label for institutions common to both parts of the monarchy, e.g., the k.u.k. Kriegsmarine (Navy) and, during the war, the k.u.k. Armee (Army). The common army changed its label from k.k. to k.u.k. only in 1889 at the request of the Hungarian government.
- K. k. (kaiserlich-königlich) or Imperial-Royal was the term for institutions of Cisleithania (Austria); "royal" in this label referred to the Crown of Bohemia.
- K. u. (königlich-ungarisch) or M. k. (Magyar királyi) ("Royal Hungarian") referred to Transleithania, the lands of the Hungarian crown. In the Kingdom of Croatia and Slavonia, the autonomous institutions used k. (kraljevski) ("Royal"), since according to the Croatian–Hungarian Settlement, the only official language in Croatia and Slavonia was Croatian, and the institutions were "only" Croatian.

== History ==
=== Background and establishment ===
Following Hungary's defeat against the Ottoman Empire in the Battle of Mohács of 1526, the Habsburg Empire became more involved in the Kingdom of Hungary, and subsequently assumed the Hungarian throne. However, as the Ottomans expanded further into Hungary, the Habsburgs came to control only a small north-western portion of the former kingdom's territory. Eventually, following the Treaty of Passarowitz in 1718, all former territories of the Hungarian kingdom were ceded from the Ottomans to the Habsburgs. In the revolutions of 1848, the Kingdom of Hungary called for greater self-government and later even independence from the Austrian Empire. The ensuing Hungarian Revolution of 1848 was crushed by the Austrian military with Russian military assistance, and the level of autonomy that the Hungarian state had enjoyed was replaced with absolutist rule from Vienna. This further increased Hungarian resentment of the Habsburg dominion.

In the 1860s, the Empire faced two severe defeats: its loss in the Second Italian War of Independence broke its dominion over a large part of Northern Italy (Lombardy, Veneto, Modena, Reggio, Tuscany, Parma and Piacenza) while defeat in the Austro-Prussian War of 1866 led to the dissolution of the German Confederation (of which the Habsburg emperor was the hereditary president) and the exclusion of Austria from German affairs. These twin defeats gave the Hungarians the opportunity to remove the shackles of absolutist rule.

Realizing the need to compromise with Hungary in order to retain its great power status, the central government in Vienna began negotiations with the Hungarian political leaders, led by Ferenc Deák. The Hungarians maintained that the April Laws were still valid, but conceded that under the Pragmatic Sanction of 1713, foreign affairs and defence were "common" to Austria and Hungary. On 20 March 1867, the newly re-established Hungarian parliament at Pest started to negotiate the new laws to be accepted on 30 March. However, Hungarian leaders received word that the Emperor's formal coronation as King of Hungary on 8 June had to have taken place in order for the laws to be enacted within the lands of the Holy Crown of Hungary. On 28 July, Franz Joseph, in his new capacity as King of Hungary, approved and promulgated the new laws, which officially gave birth to the Dual Monarchy.

=== 1866–1878: Beyond Lesser Germany ===
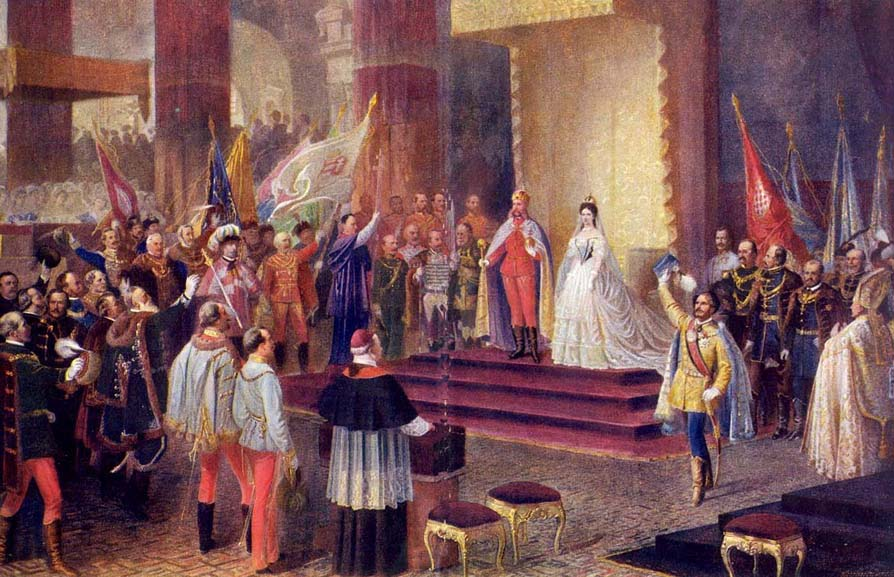
Coronation of Franz Joseph I and Elisabeth Amalie at Matthias Church, Buda, 8 June 1867

The Austro-Prussian War was ended by the Peace of Prague (1866) which settled the "German question" in favor of a Lesser German Solution. Count Friedrich Ferdinand von Beust, who was the foreign minister from 1866 to 1871, hated the Prussian chancellor, Otto von Bismarck, who had repeatedly outmaneuvered him. Beust looked to France for avenging Austria's defeat and attempted to negotiate with Emperor Napoleon III of France and Italy for an anti-Prussian alliance, but no terms could be reached. The decisive victory of the Prusso-German armies in the Franco-Prussian war and the subsequent founding of the German Empire ended all hope of re-establishing Austrian influence in Germany, and Beust retired.

After being forced out of Germany and Italy, the Dual Monarchy turned to the Balkans, which were in tumult as nationalistic movements were gaining strength and demanding independence. Both Russia and Austria–Hungary saw an opportunity to expand in this region. Russia took on the role of protector of Slavs and Orthodox Christians. Austria envisioned a multi-ethnic, religiously diverse empire under Vienna's control. Count Gyula Andrássy, a Hungarian who was Foreign Minister (1871–1879), made the centerpiece of his policy one of opposition to Russian expansion in the Balkans and blocking Serbian ambitions to dominate a new South Slav federation. He wanted Germany to ally with Austria, not Russia.

=== 1877–1908: Congress of Berlin and Balkan instability ===
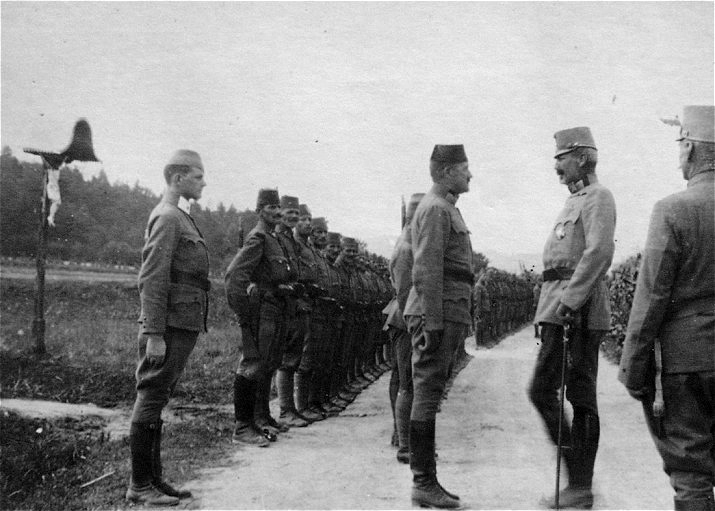
Recruits from Bosnia-Herzegovina, including Muslim Bosniaks (31%), were drafted into special units of the Austro-Hungarian Army as early as 1879 and were commended for their bravery in service of the Austrian emperor, being awarded more medals than any other unit. The military march "Die Bosniaken kommen" was composed in their honor by Eduard Wagnes.

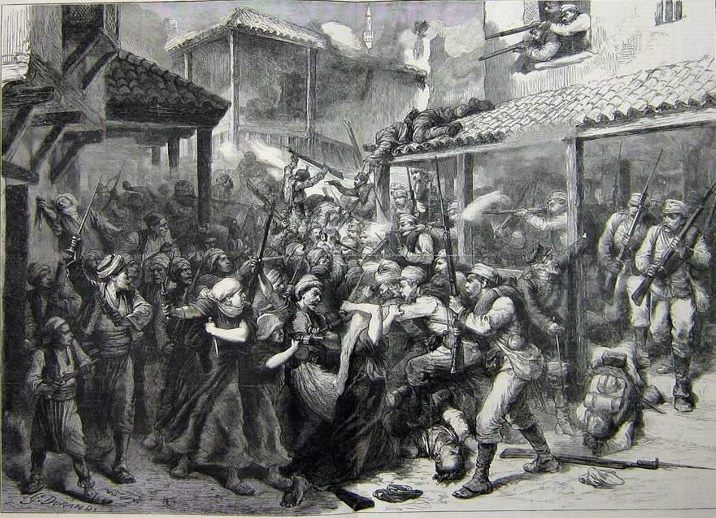
Bosnian Muslim resistance during the battle of Sarajevo in 1878 against the Austro-Hungarian occupation

Russian Pan-Slavic organizations sent aid to the Balkan rebels and so pressured the tsar's government to declare war on the Ottoman Empire in 1877 in the name of protecting Orthodox Christians. Unable to mediate between the Ottoman Empire and Russia over the control of Serbia, Austria–Hungary declared neutrality when the conflict between the two powers escalated into a war. With help from Romania and Greece, Russia defeated the Ottomans and with the Treaty of San Stefano tried to create a large pro-Russian Bulgaria.

This treaty sparked an international uproar that almost resulted in a general European war. Austria–Hungary and Britain feared that a large Bulgaria would become a Russian satellite that would enable the tsar to dominate the Balkans. British Prime Minister Benjamin Disraeli moved warships into position against Russia to halt the advance of Russian influence in the eastern Mediterranean so close to Britain's route through the Suez Canal. The Treaty of San Stefano was seen in Austria as much too favourable for Russia and its Orthodox-Slavic goals. At the Congress of Berlin in 1878, Gyula Andrássy (Minister of Foreign Affairs), with British support, managed to force Russia to reduce its excessive demands in the Balkans. As a result, Greater Bulgaria was broken up and remained under nominal Ottoman control, Serbia, Montenegro and Romania became fully independent and Austria occupied (but did not annex) the provinces of Bosnia and Herzegovina, a predominantly Slavic area. The occupation required 150,000 troops and several weeks of fighting; the provinces were put under the administration of the Ministry of Finance. In that year, with Britain's support, Austria–Hungary stationed troops in Bosnia to prevent the Russians from expanding into nearby Serbia. In another measure to keep the Russians out of the Balkans, Austria–Hungary formed an alliance, the Mediterranean Entente, with Britain and Italy in 1887 and concluded mutual defence pacts with Germany in 1879 and Romania in 1883 against a possible Russian attack. Following the Congress of Berlin the European powers attempted to guarantee stability through a complex series of alliances and treaties.

Anxious about Balkan instability and Russian aggression, and to counter French interests in Europe, Austria–Hungary forged a defensive alliance with Germany in October 1879 and in May 1882. In October 1882 Italy joined this partnership in the Triple Alliance largely because of Italy's imperial rivalries with France. Tensions between Russia and Austria–Hungary remained high, so Bismarck replaced the League of the Three Emperors with the Reinsurance Treaty with Russia to keep the Habsburgs from recklessly starting a war over Pan-Slavism. The Sandžak-Raška / Novibazar region was under Austro-Hungarian occupation between 1878 and 1909, when it was returned to the Ottoman Empire, before being ultimately divided between kingdoms of Montenegro and Serbia.

=== 1908: Bosnian Crisis ===
The monarchy eventually annexed Bosnia and Herzegovina in October 1908 as a common holding of Cisleithania and Transleithania under the control of the Imperial & Royal finance ministry rather than attaching it to either territorial government. The annexation in 1908 led some in Vienna to contemplate combining Bosnia and Herzegovina with Croatia to form a third Slavic component of the monarchy. The deaths of Franz Joseph's brother, Maximilian (1867), and his only son, Rudolf, made the Emperor's nephew, Franz Ferdinand, heir to the throne. The Archduke was rumoured to have been an advocate for this trialism as a means to limit the power of the Hungarian aristocracy.

A proclamation issued on the occasion of its annexation to the Habsburg monarchy in October 1908 promised these lands constitutional institutions, which should secure to their inhabitants full civil rights and a share in the management of their own affairs by means of a local representative assembly. In performance of this promise a constitution was promulgated in 1910.

The principal players in the Bosnian Crisis of 1908–09 were the foreign ministers of Austria and Russia, Alois Lexa von Aehrenthal and Alexander Izvolsky. Both were motivated by political ambition; the first would emerge successful, and the latter would be broken by the crisis. Along the way, they would drag Europe to the brink of war in 1909. They would also divide Europe into the two armed camps that would go to war in July 1914.

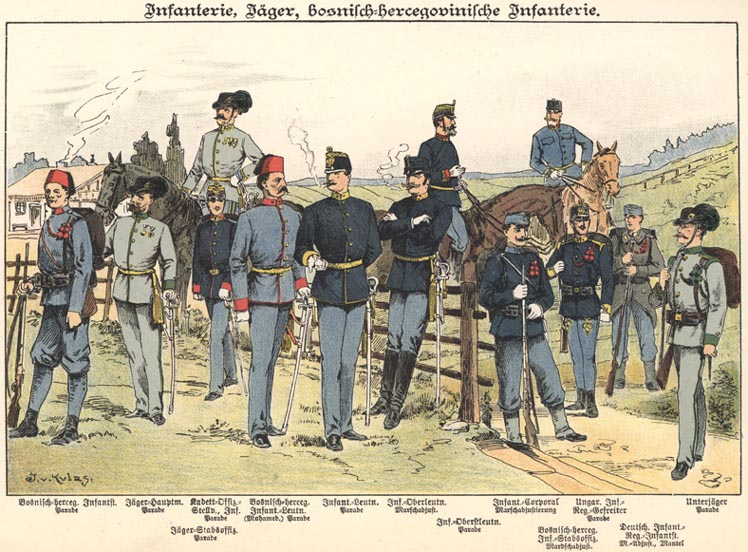
k.u.k. infantry in 1898

Aehrenthal had started with the assumption that the Slavic minorities could never come together, and the Balkan League would never cause any damage to Austria. He turned down an Ottoman proposal for an alliance that would include Austria, Turkey, and Romania. However, his policies alienated the Bulgarians, who turned instead to Russia and Serbia. Although Austria had no intention to embark on additional expansion to the south, Aehrenthal encouraged speculation to that effect, expecting that it would paralyze the Balkan states. Instead, it incited them to feverish activity to create a defensive block to stop Austria. A series of grave miscalculations at the highest level thus significantly strengthened Austria's enemies.

In 1914, Slavic militants in Bosnia rejected Austria's plan to fully absorb the area; they assassinated the Austrian heir and precipitated World War I.

=== 1914–1918: World War I ===
==== Prelude to World War I ====
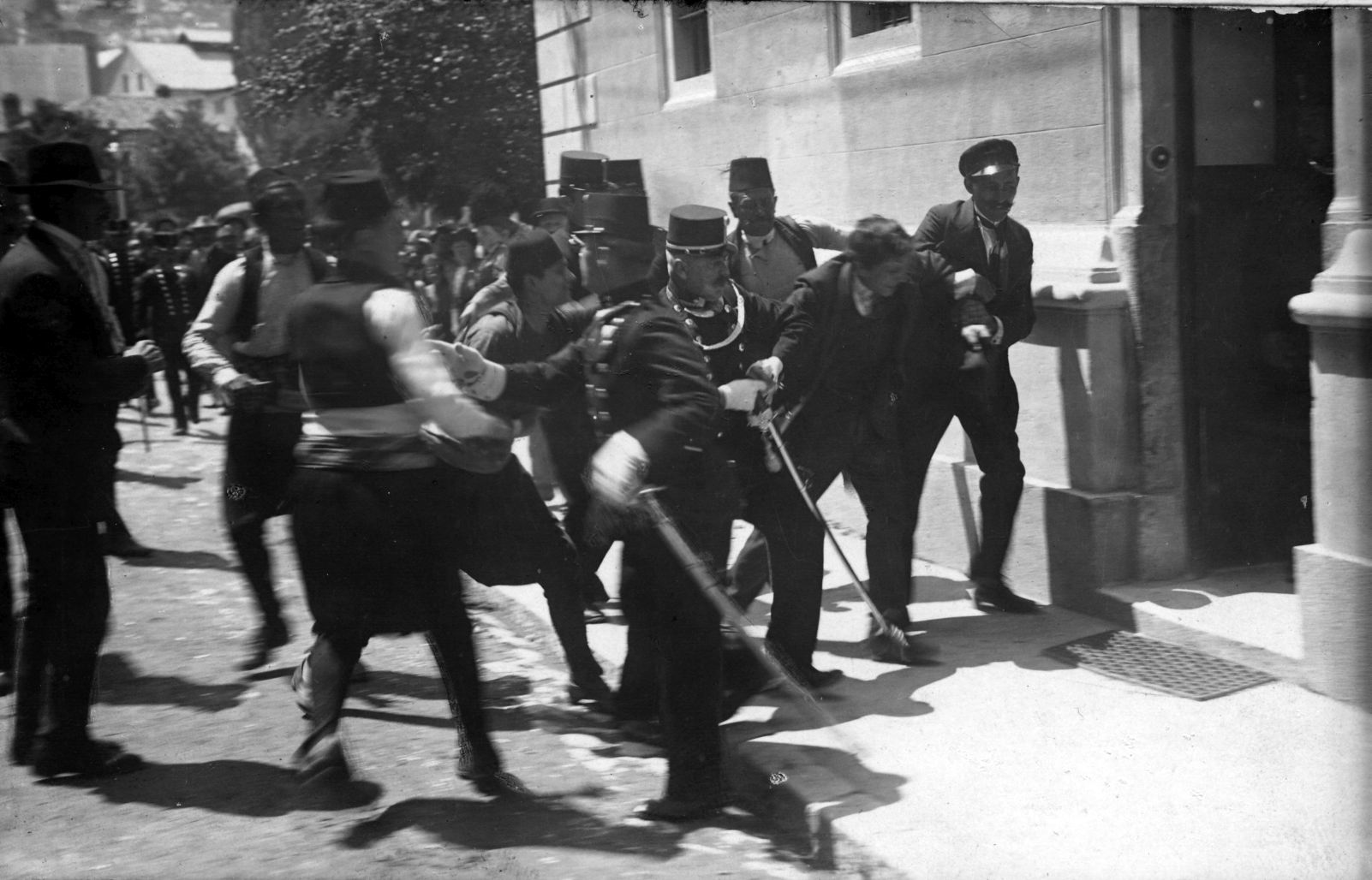
This picture of the arrest of a suspect in Sarajevo is usually associated with the capture of Gavrilo Princip, although some believe it depicts Ferdinand Behr, a bystander detained by mistake.

The 28 June 1914 assassination of Archduke Franz Ferdinand in the Bosnian capital, Sarajevo, excessively intensified the existing traditional religion-based ethnic hostilities in Bosnia. However, in Sarajevo itself, Austrian authorities encouraged violence against the Serb residents, which resulted in anti-Serb riots in Sarajevo, in which Catholic Croats and Bosnian Muslims killed two and damaged numerous Serb-owned buildings. Writer Ivo Andrić referred to the violence as the "Sarajevo frenzy of hate." Violent actions against ethnic Serbs were organized not only in Sarajevo but also in many other larger Austro-Hungarian cities in modern-day Croatia and Bosnia and Herzegovina. Austro-Hungarian authorities in Bosnia and Herzegovina imprisoned and extradited approximately 5,500 prominent Serbs, 700 to 2,200 of whom died in prison. Four hundred sixty Serbs were sentenced to death and a predominantly Muslim special militia known as the Schutzkorps was established and carried out the persecution of Serbs.

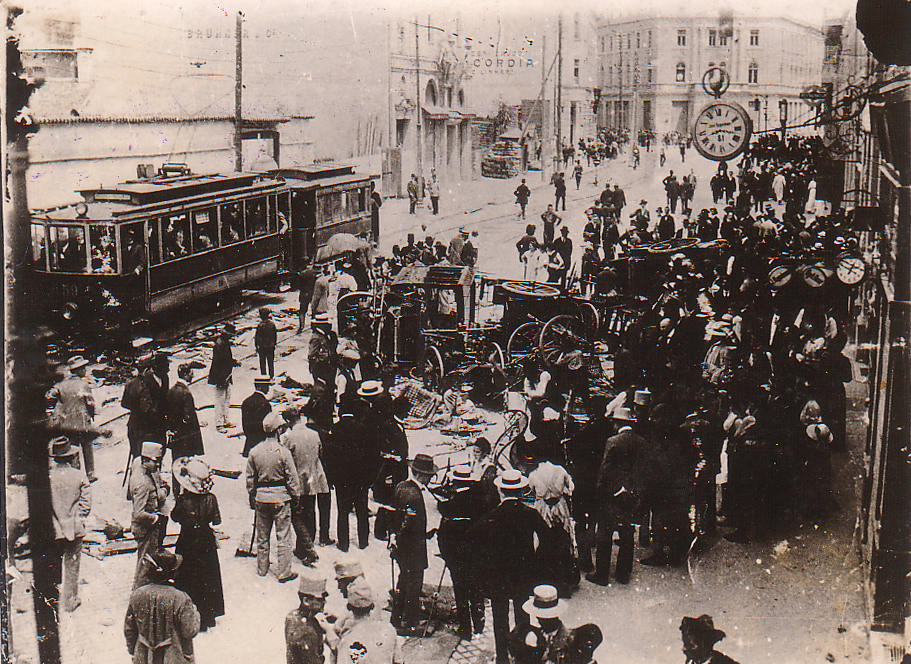
Crowds on the streets in the aftermath of the Anti-Serb riots in Sarajevo, 29 June 1914

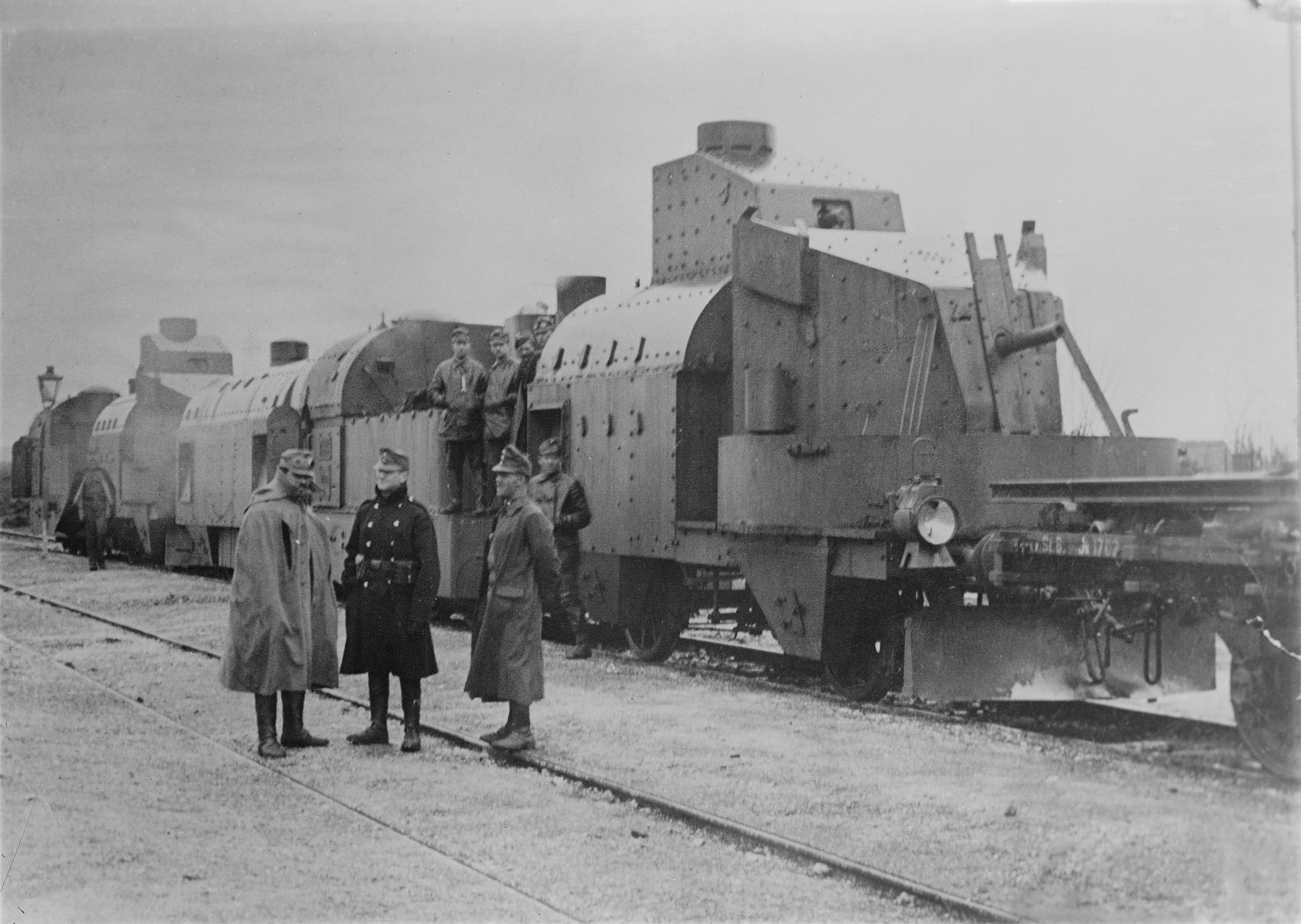
MÁVAG armoured train in 1914

Some members of the government, such as Minister of Foreign Affairs Count Leopold Berchtold and Army Commander Count Franz Conrad von Hötzendorf, had wanted to confront the resurgent Serbian nation for some years in a preventive war, but the Emperor and Hungarian prime minister István Tisza were opposed. The foreign ministry of Austro-Hungarian Empire sent ambassador László Szőgyény to Potsdam, where he inquired about the standpoint of the German emperor, Wilhelm II, on 5 July and received a supportive response.

His Majesty authorized me to report to [Franz Joseph] that in this case, too, we could count on Germany's full support. As mentioned, he first had to consult with the Chancellor, but he did not have the slightest doubt that Herr von Bethmann Hollweg would fully agree with him, particularly with regard to action on our part against Serbia. In his [Wilhelm's] opinion, though, there was no need to wait patiently before taking action...

The leaders of Austria–Hungary therefore decided to confront Serbia militarily before it could incite a revolt; using the assassination as an excuse, they presented a list of ten demands called the July Ultimatum, expecting Serbia would never accept. When Serbia accepted nine of the ten demands but only partially accepted the remaining one, Austria–Hungary declared war. Franz Joseph I finally followed the urgent counsel of his top advisers.

Over the course of July and August 1914, these events caused the start of World War I, as Russia mobilized in support of Serbia, setting off a series of counter-mobilizations. In support of his German ally, on Thursday, 6 August 1914, Emperor Franz Joseph signed the declaration of war on Russia. Italy initially remained neutral, despite its alliance with Austria–Hungary. In 1915, it switched to the side of the Entente powers, hoping to gain territory from its former ally.

==== Wartime foreign policy ====
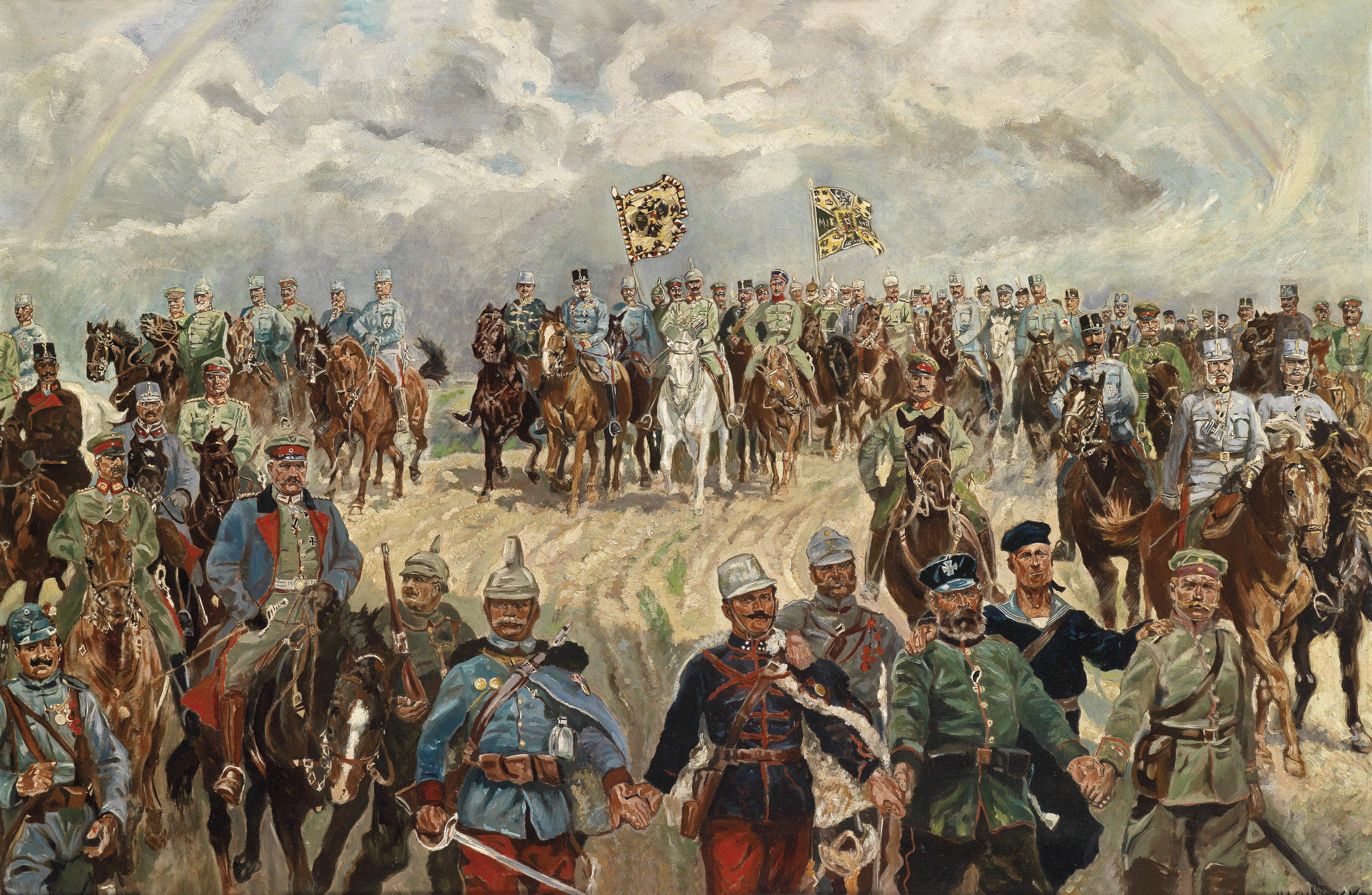
Franz Josef I and Wilhelm II with military commanders during World War I

The Austro-Hungarian Empire played a relatively passive diplomatic role in the war, as it was increasingly dominated and controlled by Germany. The only goal was to punish Serbia and try to stop the ethnic breakup of the Empire, and it completely failed. Starting in late 1916 the new Emperor Karl removed the pro-German officials and opened peace overtures to the Allies, whereby the entire war could be ended by compromise, or perhaps Austria would make a separate peace from Germany. The main effort was vetoed by Italy, which had been promised large slices of Austria for joining the Allies in 1915. Austria was only willing to turn over the Trentino region but nothing more. Karl was seen as a defeatist, which weakened his standing at home and with both the Allies and Germany.

==== Homefront ====
The heavily rural empire did have a small industrial base, but its major contributions were manpower and food. Nevertheless, Austria–Hungary was more urbanized (25%) than its actual opponents in the war, like the Russian Empire (13.4%), Serbia (13.2%) or Romania (18.8%). Furthermore, the Austro-Hungarian Empire had also more industrialized economy and higher GDP per capita than the Kingdom of Italy, which was economically the far most developed actual opponent of the Empire.

On the home front, food grew scarcer and scarcer, as did heating fuel. Hungary, with its heavy agricultural base, was somewhat better fed. The army conquered productive agricultural areas in Romania and elsewhere, but refused to allow food shipments to civilians back home. Morale fell every year, and the diverse nationalities gave up on the empire and looked for ways to establish their own nation states.

Inflation soared, from an index of 129 in 1914 to 1589 in 1918, wiping out the cash savings of the middle class. In terms of war damage to the economy, the war consumed about 20 percent of the gross domestic product. The dead soldiers amounted to about four percent of the 1914 labor force, and the wounded ones to another six percent. Compared to the major countries in the war, the death and casualty rates were toward the high end regarding the present-day territory of Austria.

By summer 1918, "Green Cadres" of army deserters formed armed bands in the hills of Croatia-Slavonia, and civil authority disintegrated. By late October, violence and massive looting erupted, and there were efforts to form peasant republics. However, the Croatian political leadership was focused on creating a new state (Yugoslavia) and worked with the advancing Serbian army to impose control and end the uprisings.

==== Theaters of operations ====
The Austro-Hungarian Empire conscripted 7.8 million soldiers during the war. General von Hötzendorf was the Chief of the Austro-Hungarian General Staff. Franz Joseph I, who was much too old to command the army, appointed Archduke Friedrich von Österreich-Teschen as Supreme Army Commander (Armeeoberkommandant), but asked him to give Von Hötzendorf freedom to take any decisions. Von Hötzendorf remained in effective command of the military forces until Emperor Karl I took supreme command himself in late 1916 and dismissed Conrad von Hötzendorf in 1917. Meanwhile, economic conditions on the home front deteriorated rapidly. The empire depended on agriculture, and agriculture depended on the heavy labor of millions of men who were now in the army. Food production fell, the transportation system became overcrowded, and industrial production could not successfully handle the overwhelming need for munitions. Germany provided a great deal of help, but it was not enough. Furthermore, the political instability of the multiple ethnic groups within the empire now ripped apart any hope for national consensus in support of the war. Increasingly there was a demand for breaking up the empire and setting up autonomous national states based on historic, language-based cultures. The new emperor sought peace terms from the Allies, but his initiatives were vetoed by Italy.

===== Serbian front 1914–1916 =====
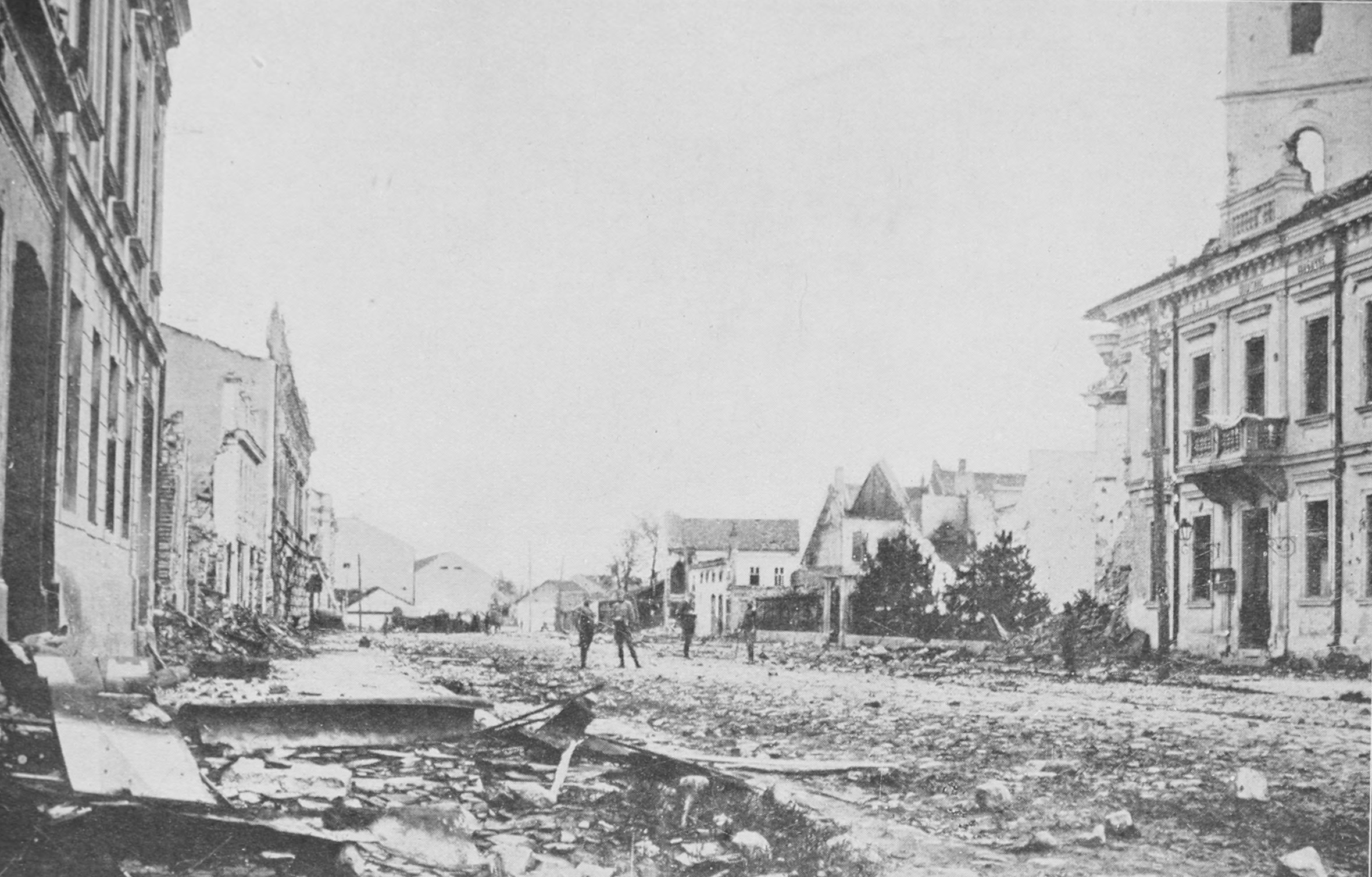
Šabac in Serbia, pictured in August 1914, was the first target of the Austro-Hungarian punitive expedition and the site of many atrocities committed against the local population.

At the start of the war, the army was divided into two: the smaller part attacked Serbia, while the larger part fought against the formidable Imperial Russian Army. The invasion of Serbia in 1914 was a disaster: by the end of the year, the Austro-Hungarian Army had taken no territory, but had lost 227,000 out of a total force of 450,000 men. However, in the autumn of 1915, the Serbian Army was defeated by the Central Powers, which led to the occupation of Serbia. Near the end of 1915, in a massive rescue operation involving more than 1,000 trips made by Italian, French and British steamers, 260,000 Serb soldiers were transported to Brindisi and Corfu, where they waited for the chance of the victory of Allied powers to reclaim their country. Corfu hosted the Serbian government in exile after the collapse of Serbia and served as a supply base for the Greek front. In April 1916 a large number of Serbian troops were transported in British and French naval vessels from Corfu to mainland Greece. The contingent numbering over 120,000 relieved a much smaller army at the Macedonian front and fought alongside British and French troops.

===== Russian front 1914–1917 =====
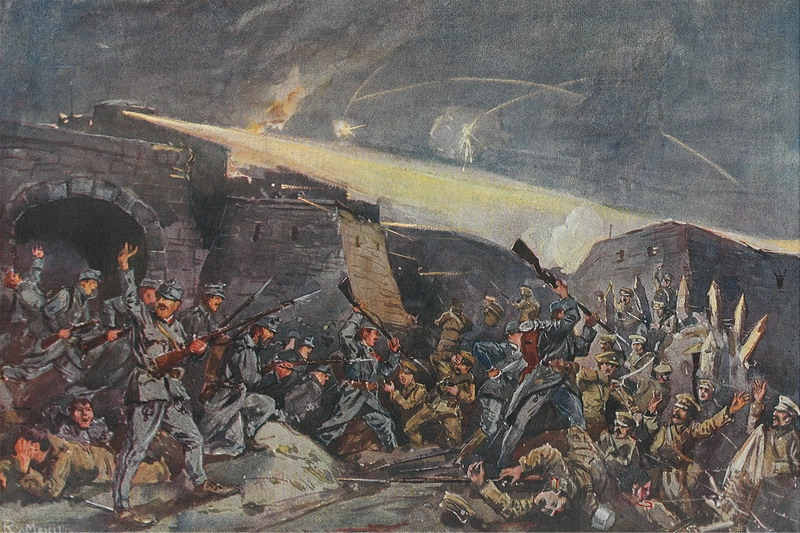
Siege of Przemyśl in 1915

On the Eastern front, the war started out equally poorly. The government accepted the Polish proposal of establishing the Supreme National Committee as the Polish central authority within the empire, responsible for the formation of the Polish Legions, an auxiliary military formation within the Austro-Hungarian Army. The Austro-Hungarian Army was defeated at the Battle of Lemberg and the great fortress city of Przemyśl was besieged and fell in March 1915. The Gorlice–Tarnów Offensive started as a minor German offensive to relieve the pressure of the Russian numerical superiority on the Austro-Hungarians, but the cooperation of the Central Powers resulted in huge Russian losses and the total collapse of the Russian lines and their 100 km (62 mi) long retreat into Russia. The Russian Third Army disintegrated. In summer 1915, the Austro-Hungarian Army, under a unified command with the Germans, participated in the successful Gorlice–Tarnów Offensive. From June 1916, the Russians focused their attacks on the Austro-Hungarian Army in the Brusilov Offensive, recognizing the latter's numerical inferiority. By the end of September 1916, Austria–Hungary mobilized and concentrated new divisions, and the successful Russian advance was halted and slowly repelled; but the Austrian armies took heavy losses (about 1 million men) and never recovered. Nevertheless, the huge losses in men and materiel inflicted on the Russians during the offensive contributed greatly to the Russian Revolution of 1917 and caused an economic crash in the Russian Empire.

The Act of 5 November 1916 was then proclaimed to the Poles jointly by the Emperors Wilhelm II of Germany and Franz Joseph of Austria-Hungary. This act promised the creation of the Kingdom of Poland out of the territory of Congress Poland, envisioned by its authors as a puppet state controlled by the Central Powers, with the nominal authority vested in the Regency Council. The origin of that document was the dire need to draft new recruits from German-occupied Poland for the war with Russia. Following the Armistice of 11 November 1918 ending the World War I, in spite of the previous initial total dependence of the kingdom on its sponsors, it ultimately served against their intentions as the cornerstone proto state of the nascent Second Polish Republic, the latter composed also of territories never intended by the Central Powers to be ceded to Poland.

The Battle of Zborov (1917) was the first significant action of the Czechoslovak Legions, which fought for the independence of Czechoslovakia against the Austro-Hungarian Army.

===== Italian front 1915–1918 =====
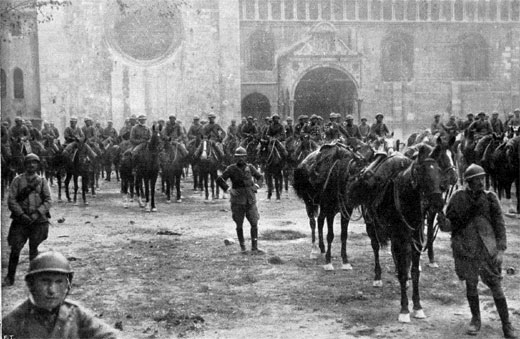
Italian troops in Trento on 3 November 1918, after the Battle of Vittorio Veneto. Italy's victory marked the end of the war on the Italian Front and secured the dissolution of Austria–Hungary.

In May 1915, Italy attacked Austria–Hungary. Italy was the only military opponent of Austria–Hungary which had a similar degree of industrialization and economic level; moreover, her army was numerous (≈1,000,000 men were immediately fielded), but suffered from poor leadership, training and organization. Chief of Staff Luigi Cadorna marched his army towards the Isonzo River, hoping to seize Ljubljana, and to eventually threaten Vienna. However, the Royal Italian Army were halted on the river, where four battles took place over five months (23 June – 2 December 1915). The fight was extremely bloody and exhausting for both sides.

On 15 May 1916, Austrian Chief of Staff Conrad von Hötzendorf launched the Strafexpedition ("punitive expedition"): the Austrians broke through the front and occupied the Asiago plateau. The Italians managed to resist and in a counteroffensive seized Gorizia on 9 August. Nonetheless, they had to stop on the Carso, a few kilometres away from the border. At this point, several months of indecisive trench warfare ensued (analogous to the Western front). As the Russian Empire collapsed as a result of the Bolshevik Revolution and the Russians ended their involvement in the war, Germans and Austrians were able to transfer much of their manpower to the Western and Southern fronts from the erstwhile Eastern fighting.

On 24 October 1917, Austrians (now enjoying decisive German support) attacked at Caporetto using new infiltration tactics; although they advanced more than 100 km (62.14 mi) in the direction of Venice and gained considerable supplies, they were halted and could not cross the Piave River. Italy, although suffering massive casualties, recovered from the blow, and a coalition government under Vittorio Emanuele Orlando was formed. Italy also enjoyed the support of the Entente: by 1918, large amounts of war materials and a few auxiliary American, British, and French divisions arrived in the Italian battle zone. Cadorna was replaced by General Armando Diaz; under his command, the Italians retook the initiative and won the decisive Second Battle of the Piave River (15–23 June 1918), in which some 60,000 Austrian and 43,000 Italian soldiers were killed. The final battle at Vittorio Veneto was lost by 31 October 1918 and the armistice was signed at Villa Giusti on 3 November.

===== Romanian front 1916–1917 =====
On 27 August 1916, Romania declared war against Austria–Hungary. The Romanian Army crossed the borders of eastern Hungary (Transylvania), but despite initial successes, by November 1916, the Austro-Hungarian, German, Bulgarian, and Ottoman armies had defeated the Romanian and Russian armies, and occupied the southern part of Romania (including Oltenia, Muntenia and Dobruja). Within three months of the war, the Central Powers approached Bucharest, the Romanian capital. On 6 December, Bucharest was captured, and part of the population moved to the unoccupied Romanian territory, in Moldavia, together with the Romanian government, royal court and public authorities, which relocated to Iași. In 1917, after several defensive victories (managing to stop the German-Austro-Hungarian advance), with Russia's withdrawal from the war following the October Revolution, Romania was forced to drop out of the war.

==== Role of Hungary ====
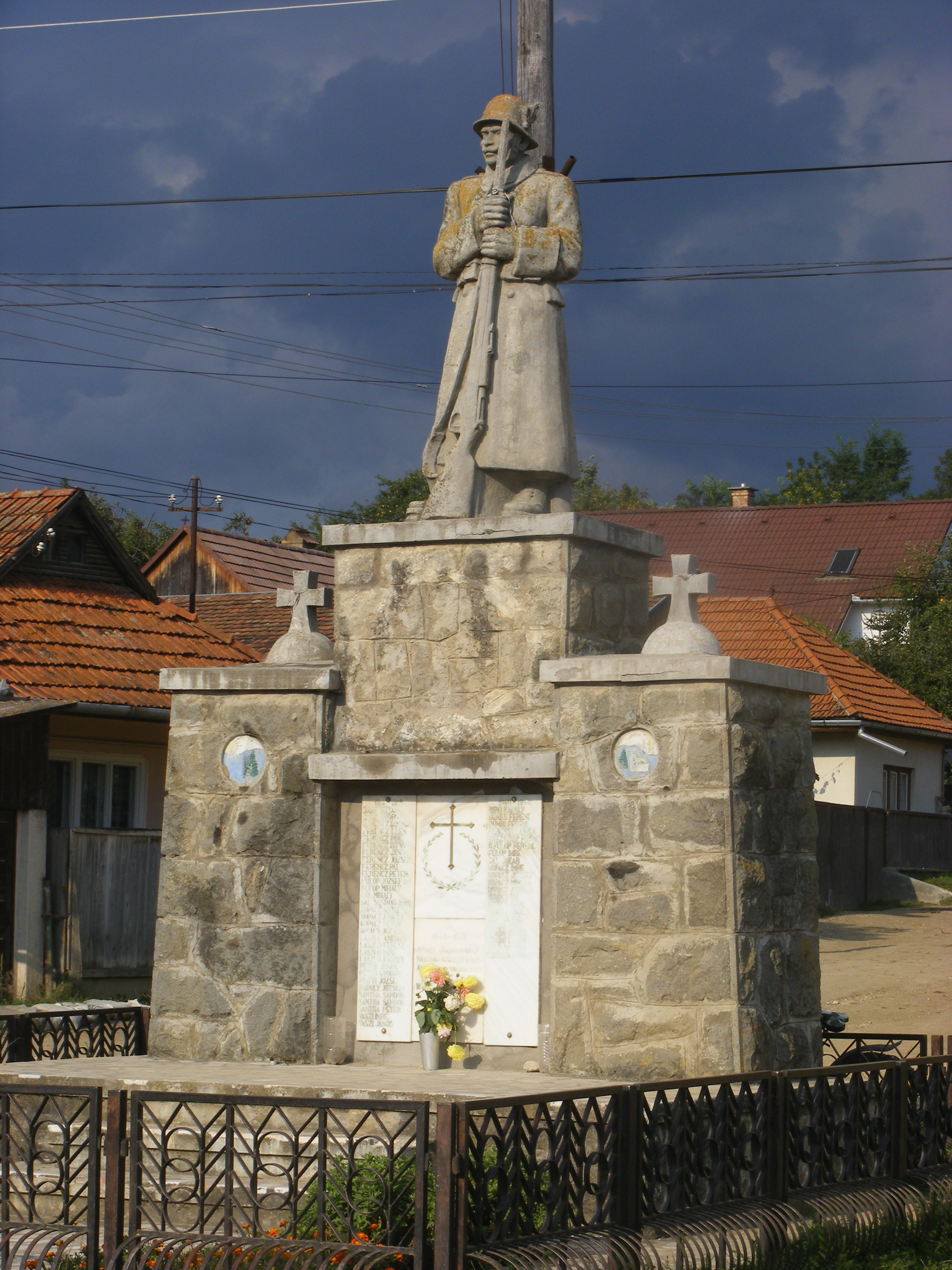
War memorial in Păuleni-Ciuc, Romania

Although the Kingdom of Hungary comprised only 42% of the population of Austria–Hungary, the thin majority— more than 3.8 million soldiers—of the Austro-Hungarian armed forces were conscripted from the Kingdom of Hungary during the First World War. Roughly 600,000 soldiers were killed in action, and 700,000 soldiers were wounded in the war.

Austria–Hungary held on for years, as the Hungarian half provided sufficient supplies for the military to continue to wage war. This was shown in a transition of power after which the Hungarian prime minister, Count István Tisza, and foreign minister, Count István Burián, had decisive influence over the internal and external affairs of the monarchy. By late 1916, food supply from Hungary became intermittent and the government sought an armistice with the Entente powers. However, this failed as Britain and France no longer had any regard for the integrity of the monarchy due to Austro-Hungarian support for Germany.

==== Analysis of defeat ====
The setbacks that the Austrian army suffered in 1914 and 1915 can be attributed to a large extent by the incompetence of the Austrian high command. After attacking Serbia, its forces soon had to be withdrawn to protect its eastern frontier against Russia's invasion, while German units were engaged in fighting on the Western Front. This resulted in a greater than expected loss of men in the invasion of Serbia. Furthermore, it became evident that the Austrian high command had had no plans for possible continental war and that the army and navy were also ill-equipped to handle such a conflict.

In the last two years of the war the Austro-Hungarian armed forces lost all ability to act independently of Germany. As of 7 September 1916, the German emperor was given full control of all the armed forces of the Central Powers and Austria-Hungary effectively became a satellite of Germany. The Austrians viewed the German army favorably; on the other hand, by 1916 the general belief in Germany was that Germany, in its alliance with Austria–Hungary, was "shackled to a corpse". The operational capability of the Austro-Hungarian army was seriously affected by supply shortages, low morale and a high casualty rate, and by the army's composition of multiple ethnicities with different languages and customs.

=== 1918: Demise, disintegration, dissolution ===
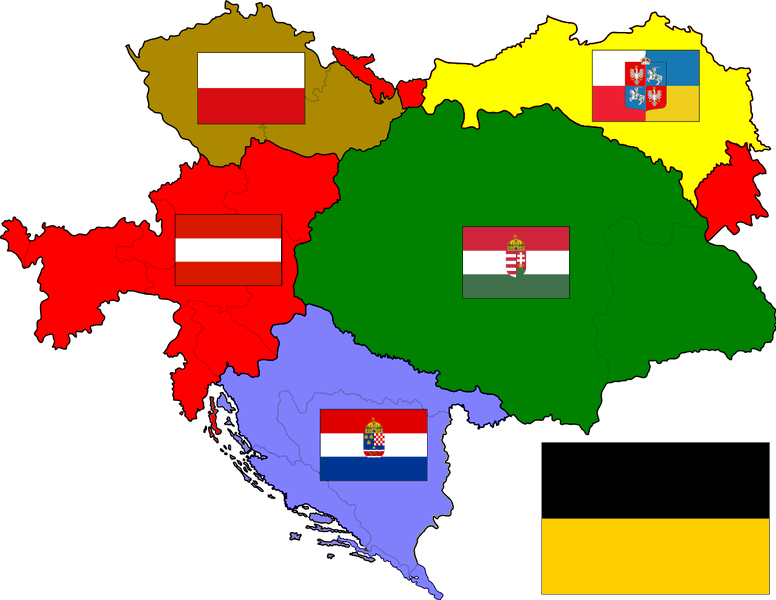
Karl I of Austria envisaged the Habsburg Empire as being made up of five Kingdoms, in a last desperate attempt to save the Monarchy.

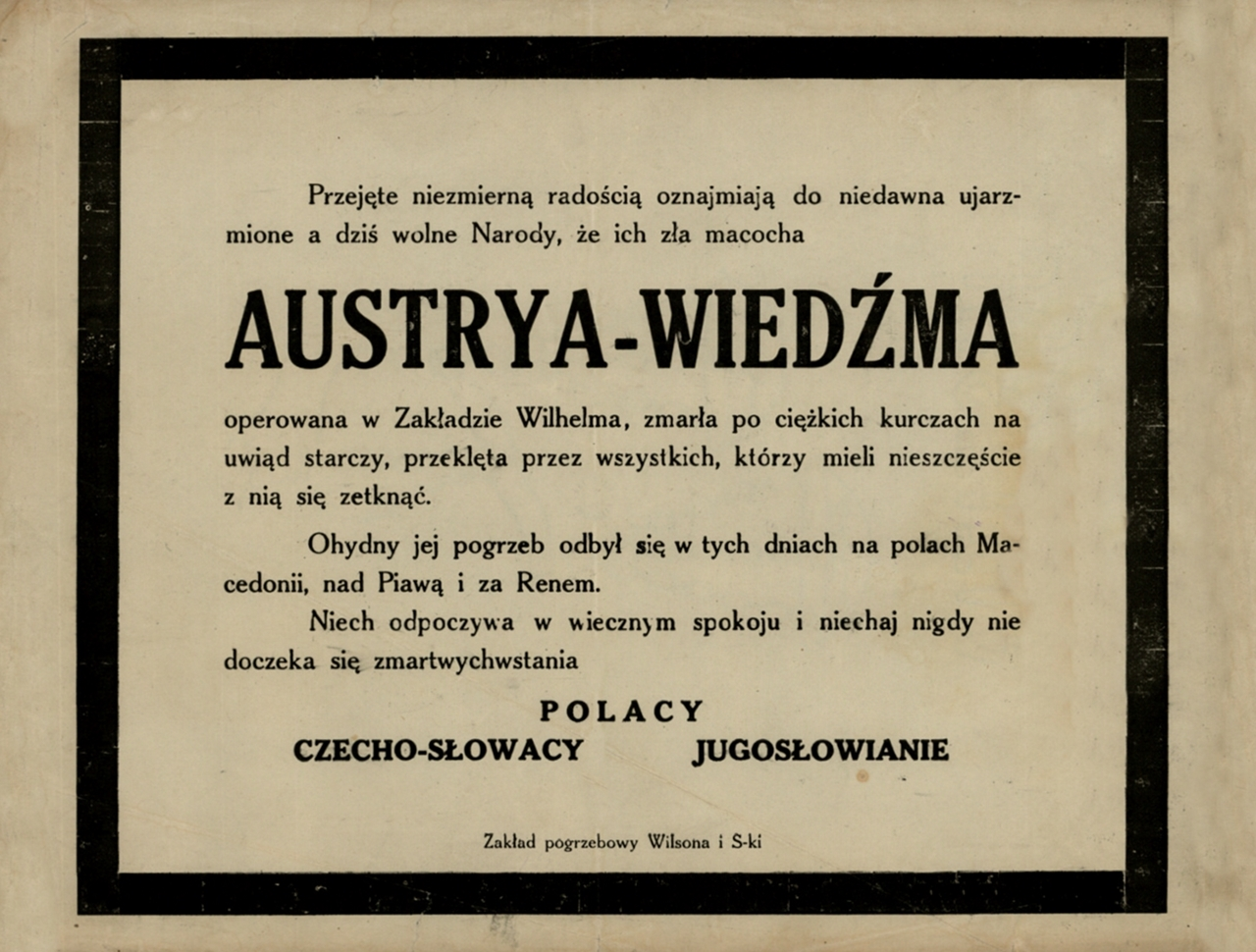
A humorous "obituary" of the Austrian Empire, published in Kraków in late 1918. Translation: "Overwhelmed with joy, until recently enslaved and now free Nations announce that their wicked step-mother AUSTRIA the WITCH, operated in William's Clinic, died from senility after severe spasms, cursed by all those who had the infelicity of having to do with her. Her dreadful funeral took place during these days in the fields of Macedonia, on the Piave River and across the Rhine. Let her rest in eternal peace and may she never raise from the dead. POLES, CZECHO-SLOVAKS, YUGOSLAVS Funeral home Wilson & Co."

By 1918, the economic situation had deteriorated and governmental failure on the homefront ended popular support for the war. The Austro-Hungarian monarchy collapsed with dramatic speed in the autumn of 1918. Leftist and pacifist political movements organized strikes in factories, and uprisings in the army had become commonplace. As the war went on, the ethnic unity declined; the Allies encouraged breakaway demands from minorities and the Empire faced disintegration. With apparent Allied victory approaching, nationalist movements seized ethnic resentment to erode social unity. The military breakdown of the Italian front marked the start of the rebellion for the numerous ethnicities who made up the multiethnic Empire, as they refused to keep on fighting for a cause that now appeared senseless. The Emperor had lost much of his power to rule, as his realm disintegrated.

On 14 October 1918, Foreign Minister Baron István Burián von Rajecz asked for an armistice based on President Woodrow Wilson's Fourteen Points and two days later Emperor Karl I issued a proclamation ("Imperial Manifesto of 16 October 1918") altering the empire into a federal union to give ethnic groups decentralization and representation. However, on 18 October, United States Secretary of State Robert Lansing replied that autonomy for the nationalities – the tenth of the Fourteen Points – was no longer enough. In fact, a Czechoslovak provisional government had joined the Allies on 14 October. The South Slavs in both halves of the monarchy had already declared in favor of uniting with Serbia in a large South Slav state in the 1917 Corfu Declaration signed by members of the Yugoslav Committee. The Croatians had begun disregarding orders from Budapest earlier in October. Lansing's response was, in effect, the death certificate of Austria–Hungary.

During the Italian battles, the Czechoslovaks and Southern Slavs declared their independence. With defeat in the war imminent after the Italian offensive in the Battle of Vittorio Veneto on 24 October, Czech politicians peacefully took over command in Prague on 28 October (later declared the birth of Czechoslovakia) and followed up in other major cities in the next few days. On 30 October, the Slovaks did the same. On 29 October, the Slavs in both portions of what remained of Austria–Hungary proclaimed the State of Slovenes, Croats and Serbs and declared that their ultimate intention was to unite with Serbia and Montenegro in a large South Slav state. On the same day, the Czechs and Slovaks formally proclaimed the establishment of Czechoslovakia as an independent state.

On 17 October 1918, the Hungarian Parliament voted in favour of terminating the union with Austria. The most prominent opponent of continued union with Austria, Count Mihály Károlyi, seized power in the Aster Revolution on 31 October. Charles was all but forced to appoint Károlyi as his Hungarian prime minister. One of Károlyi's first acts was to formally repudiate the compromise agreement on 31 October, effectively terminating the personal union with Austria and thus officially dissolving the Austro-Hungarian state.

By the end of October, there was nothing left of the Habsburg realm but its majority-German Danubian and Alpine provinces, and Karl's authority was being challenged even there by the German-Austrian state council. Karl's last Austrian prime minister, Heinrich Lammasch, concluded that Karl's position was untenable. Lammasch persuaded Karl that the best course was to relinquish, at least temporarily, his right to exercise sovereign authority. On 11 November, Karl issued a carefully worded proclamation in which he recognized the Austrian people's right to determine the form of the state and "relinquish(ed) every participation" in Austrian state affairs. On the day after he announced his withdrawal from Austrian politics, the German-Austrian National Council proclaimed the Republic of German Austria. Károlyi followed suit on 16 November, proclaiming the Hungarian Democratic Republic.

== Government ==
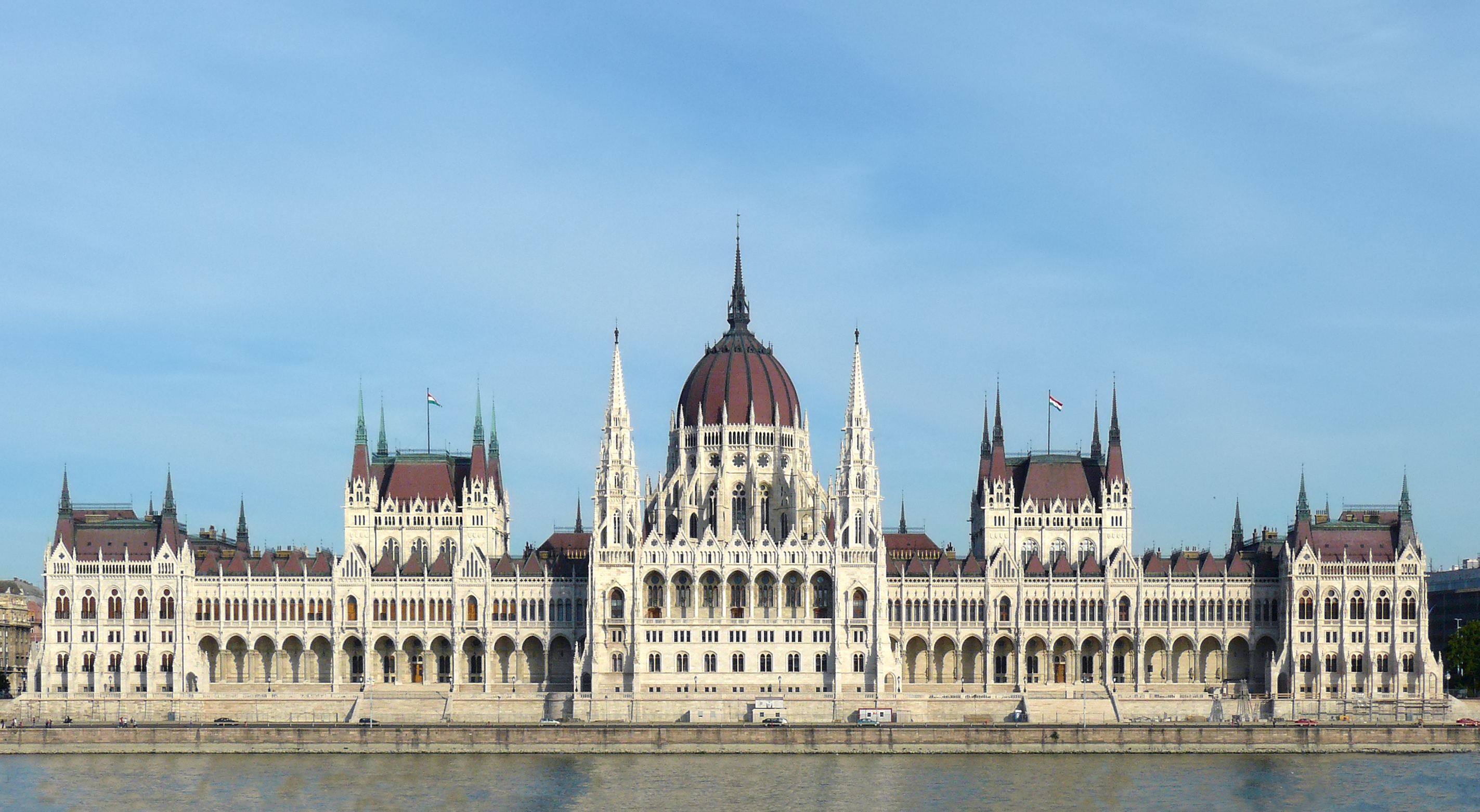
Hungarian Parliament building

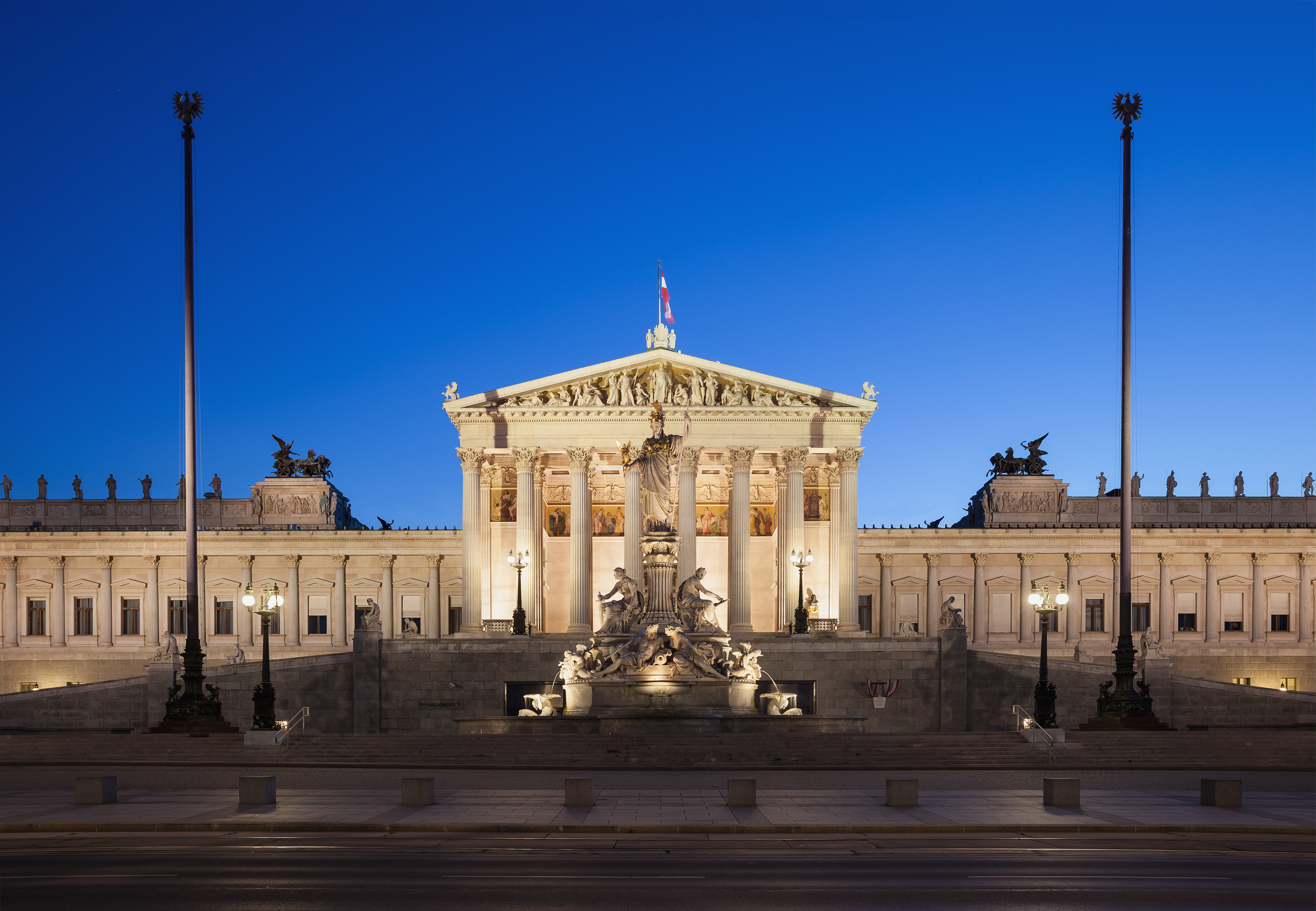
Austrian Parliament building

The Compromise of 1867 turned the Habsburg domains into a real union between the Austrian Empire ("Lands Represented in the Imperial Council", or Cisleithania) in the western and northern half and the Kingdom of Hungary ("Lands of the Crown of Saint Stephen", or Transleithania) in the eastern half.

The government of Austria, which had ruled the monarchy until 1867, became the government of the Austrian part, and another government was formed for the Hungarian part. The common government (officially designated Ministerial Council for Common Affairs, or Ministerrat für gemeinsame Angelegenheiten in German) formed for the few matters of common national security - the Common Army, Navy, foreign policy and the imperial household, and the customs union. Although the two halves shared a common monarch and both foreign relations and defense were managed jointly, all other state functions were to be handled separately as there was no common citizenship. (Note: "The kingdom of Hungary desired equal status with the Austrian empire, which was weakened by its defeat in the German (Austro-Prussian) War of 1866. The Austrian emperor Francis Joseph gave Hungary full internal autonomy, together with a responsible ministry, and in return it agreed that the empire should still be a single great state for purposes of war and foreign affairs, thus maintaining its dynastic prestige abroad.")

Hungary and Austria maintained separate parliaments, each with its own prime minister: the Diet of Hungary (commonly known as the National Assembly) and the Imperial Council (German: Reichsrat) in Cisleithania. Each parliament had its own executive government, appointed by the monarch.

After 1878, Bosnia and Herzegovina came under Austro-Hungarian military and civilian rule until it was fully annexed in 1908, provoking the Bosnian crisis with the Great Powers and Austria-Hungary's Balkan neighbors, Serbia and Montenegro.

Relations during the half-century after 1867 between the two parts of the dual monarchy featured repeated disputes over shared external tariff arrangements and over the financial contribution of each government to the common treasury. These matters were determined by the Austro-Hungarian Compromise of 1867, in which common expenditures were allocated 70% to Austria and 30% to Hungary. This division had to be renegotiated every ten years. There was political turmoil during the build-up to each renewal of the agreement. By 1907, the Hungarian share had risen to 36.4%. The disputes culminated in the early 1900s in a prolonged constitutional crisis. It was triggered by disagreement over which language to use for command in Hungarian army units and deepened by the advent to power in Budapest in April 1906 of a Hungarian nationalist coalition. Provisional renewals of the common arrangements occurred in October 1907 and in November 1917 on the basis of the status quo. The negotiations in 1917 ended with the dissolution of the Dual Monarchy.

== Geography ==
To the north, Austria-Hungary bordered Saxony, Prussia, and Russia; to the east, Romania and Russia; to the south, Romania, Serbia, the Ottoman Empire, Montenegro, and Italy, and it was washed by the Adriatic Sea; to the west, it bordered Italy, Switzerland, Liechtenstein, and Bavaria (from 1871, Saxony, Prussia, and Bavaria were part of the German Empire).

Austria-Hungary was predominantly a continental power, with access only to the Adriatic Sea, where the country's main ports were located—Trieste (Cisleithania) and Fiume (now Rijeka, Transleithania). The largest peninsulas of the country were Istria and Sabbioncello (now Pelješac, Croatia). The largest islands were Veglia (Krk), Cherso (Cres), Pago (Pag), Brazza (Brač), Lesina (Hvar), Curzola (Korčula), and Meleda (Mljet).

The relief of Austria-Hungary was predominantly mountainous: about three quarters of the country consisted of mountains, and only one quarter of plains and lowlands. The mountain systems of Austria-Hungary included:

- the eastern regions of the Alps, including part of the Ortler massif, where the highest point of Austria-Hungary was located—Mount Ortler (German: Ortler);
- the mountains of Bohemia and Moravia;
- part of the Carpathian Mountains;
- part of the Balkan Mountains.

The lowlands of Austria-Hungary included:

- Tullnerfeld
- the Vienna Basin (Central Danubian Lowland)
- Kisalföld (Little Hungarian Plain)
- Alföld (Great Hungarian Plain)
- the lowlands of the Vistula and Dniester rivers

The largest bays of Austria-Hungary were the Gulf of Trieste and the Kvarner Gulf; the Bay of Kotor was also of importance.

The most important rivers of Austria-Hungary:

- the Elbe, Oder, Vistula, Dniester, and Adige originated in Austria-Hungary and flowed into the sea outside the country;
- the Danube (the main river of the empire) originated outside the country and also flowed into the sea beyond Austria-Hungary;
- a small section of the western border of Vorarlberg was (and still is) washed by the Rhine;
- navigation on the Po River was controlled by the largest Austro-Hungarian shipping company, Austrian Lloyd, and the river was also considered part of the river system of Austria-Hungary.

Other major rivers of the country included the Tisza, Sava, and Western Bug.

The waters of the rivers flowing through Austria-Hungary belonged to the basins of four seas, as symbolized by the “Austria” Fountain in Vienna, which allegorically depicts four rivers of Austria-Hungary flowing into four seas—the Baltic (Vistula), Black (Danube), Adriatic (Po), and North (Elbe).

The largest lakes of Austria-Hungary:

- Plattensee (now Balaton in Hungary)
- Bodensee
- Garda
- Neusiedler See
- Attersee
- Wörthersee

The extreme settlements of Austria-Hungary:

- the northernmost settlement coincided with the northernmost settlement of the present-day Czech Republic—the village of Hilgersdorf in the district of Hainspach (now Severní);
- the westernmost coincided with the westernmost settlement of modern Austria—the village of Bangs near Feldkirch in Vorarlberg;
- the southernmost was Spizza in Dalmatia (now Sutomore, Montenegro);
- the easternmost was Chilișeni in Bukovina (now in Romania).

For the purpose of studying the territory of the country, efforts were undertaken to map the lands within it. Three major cartographic surveys are known, named after the emperors under whom they were conducted:

- the Josephinian Land Survey (German: Josephinische Landesaufnahme), carried out in the 1760s–1780s under Joseph II;
- the Second Military Survey (German: Franzisco-Josephinische Landesaufnahme), carried out in the 1810s–1850s under Francis II;
- the Third Military Survey (German: Franzisco-Josephinische Landesaufnahme), carried out in the 1870s–1880s under Franz Joseph I.

There also exists the reference work The Austro-Hungarian Monarchy in Word and Image (German: Die österreichisch-ungarische Monarchie in Wort und Bild), a 24-volume encyclopedia devoted to the regional and cultural features of the Austro-Hungarian Monarchy. The encyclopedia was initiated in 1883 at the initiative of the Austro-Hungarian Crown Prince Rudolf, and is therefore also known as the Crown Prince's Work (German: Kronprinzenwerk). A total of 432 authors participated in its creation, including Crown Prince Rudolf himself, who died by suicide in 1889. The encyclopedia was published in German (24 volumes) and Hungarian (21 volumes; Hungarian: Az Osztrák–Magyar Monarchia írásban és képben). The German edition contains 587 articles across 12,596 pages of text, as well as 4,529 wood engravings.

=== Imperial borders ===
As Austria-Hungary was a union of two states, an internal border existed between the two halves of the monarchy. There was no passport control along this border, although an internal customs line (Zwischenzoll-Linie) existed between the Austrian and Hungarian halves of the empire.

The best-known settlement on the internal imperial border was Bruck an der Leitha, located on the Leitha River, from whose name the terms Cisleithania and Transleithania were derived. On the Hungarian side, the corresponding border settlement was Bruckneudorf (Bruckneudorf, Királyhida). Border railway stations and customs facilities were located in both settlements.

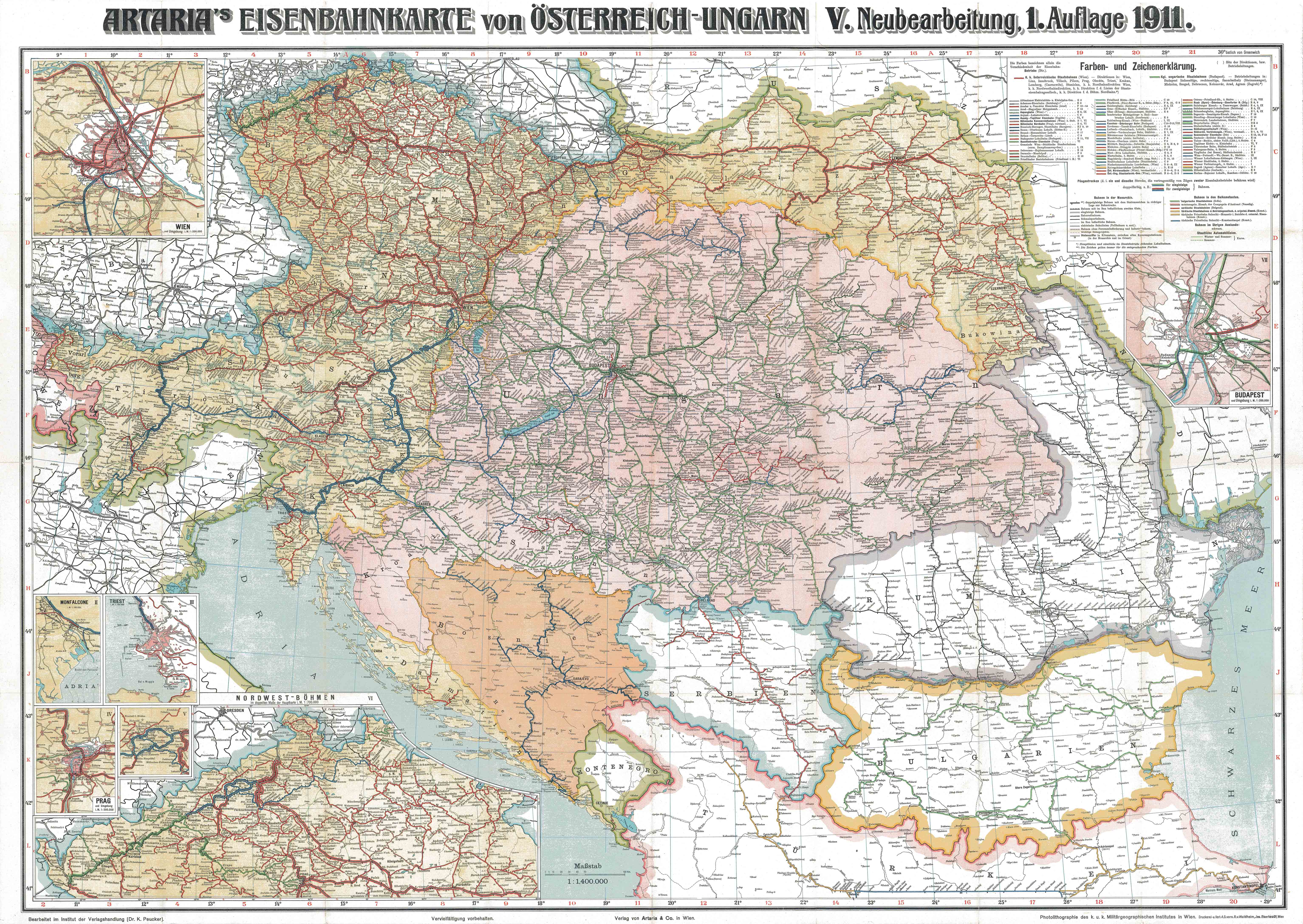
Railway map of Austria-Hungary in 1911

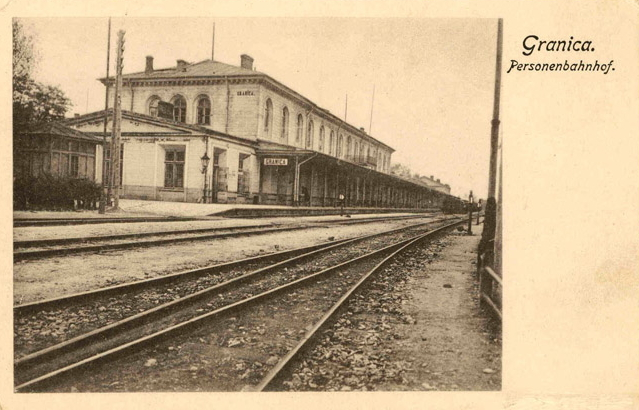
Granica station (Sosnowiec Maczki)

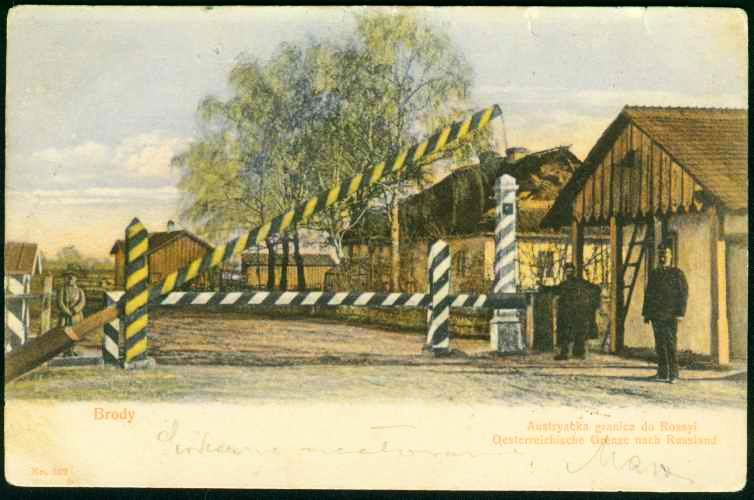
Austro-Russian border at Brody, 1905

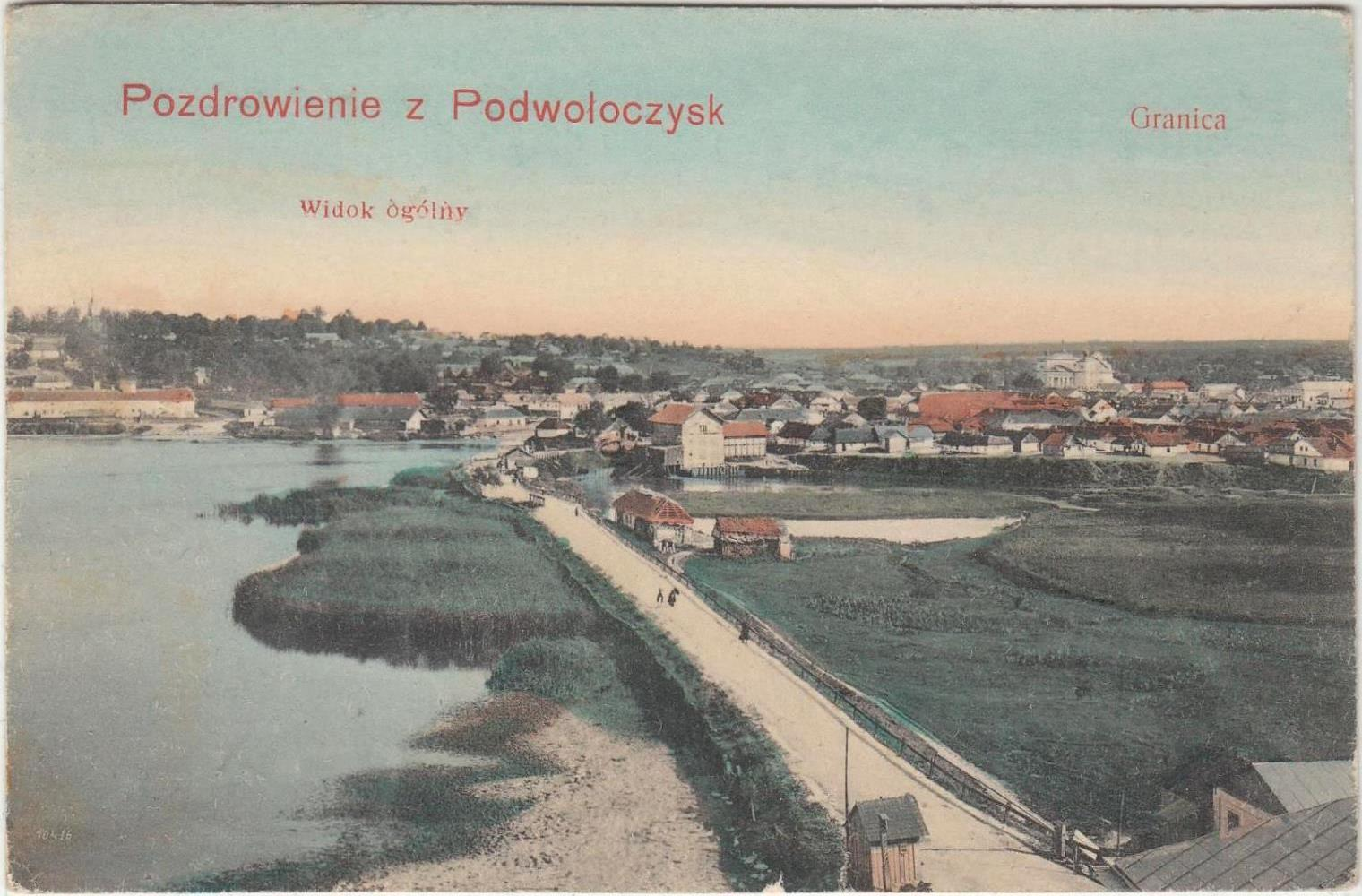
Pidvolochysk station

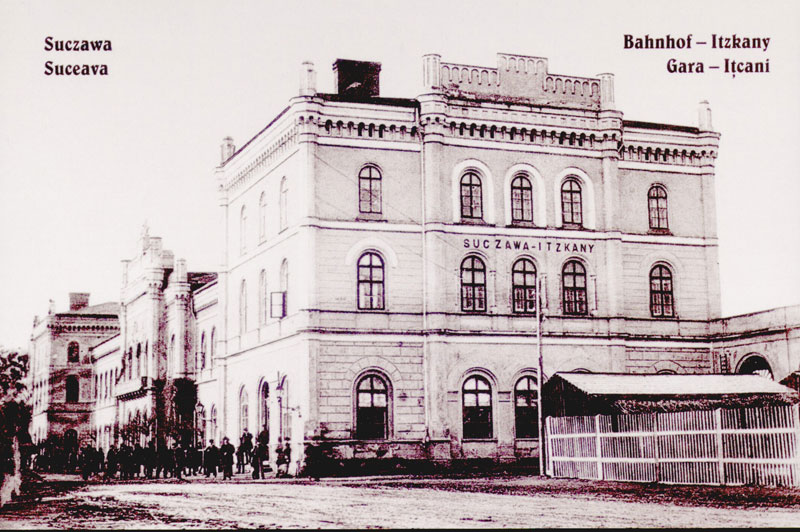
Suceava Nord station (Ițcani)

Important border railway stations of the empire (the Austro-Hungarian station is listed on the left, and the corresponding foreign border station immediately across the frontier on the right):

- (Austria-Hungary) Spitzberg / Železná Ruda ⇄ (German Empire) Bayerisch Eisenstein
- (Austria-Hungary) Salzburg ⇄ (German Empire) Freilassing
- (Austria-Hungary) Kufstein ⇄ (German Empire) Kiefersfelden
- (Austria-Hungary) Schärding ⇄ (German Empire) Passau
- (Austria-Hungary) Tetschen-Bodenbach (Děčín) ⇄ (German Empire) Schöna (Reinhardtsdorf-Schöna)
- (Austria-Hungary) Eger (Cheb) ⇄ (German Empire) Schirnding
- (Austria-Hungary) Oderberg (Bohumín) ⇄ (German Empire) Annaberg (now Chałupki)
- (Austria-Hungary) Szczakowa ⇄ (Russian Empire) Granica
- (Austria-Hungary) Brody ⇄ (Russian Empire) Radziwiłłów
- (Austria-Hungary) Pidvolochysk ⇄ (Russian Empire) Volochysk
- (Austria-Hungary) Husiatyn ⇄ (Russian Empire) Husiatyn
- (Austria-Hungary) Novoselytsia ⇄ (Russian Empire) Novoselytsia
- (Austria-Hungary) Ițcani ⇄ (Kingdom of Romania) Burdujeni
- (Austria-Hungary) Gyimesbükk ⇄ (Kingdom of Romania) Palanca
- (Austria-Hungary) Predeal ⇄ (Kingdom of Romania) Predeal
- (Austria-Hungary) Orșova ⇄ (Kingdom of Romania) Verciorova
- (Austria-Hungary) Ala, Trentino ⇄ (Kingdom of Italy) Peri
- (Austria-Hungary) Tezze ⇄ (Kingdom of Italy) Primolano
- (Austria-Hungary) Pontafel ⇄ (Kingdom of Italy) Pontebba
- (Austria-Hungary) Cormons ⇄ (Kingdom of Italy) San Giovanni al Natisone
- (Austria-Hungary) Cervignano ⇄ (Kingdom of Italy) San Giorgio di Nogaro
- (Austria-Hungary) Zemun / Semlin ⇄ (Kingdom of Serbia) Belgrade
- (Austria-Hungary) Feldkirch ⇄ (Switzerland) Buchs (St. Gallen)
- (Austria-Hungary) Bregenz / Lauterach ⇄ (Switzerland) St. Margrethen

== Demographics ==
Ethno-linguistic map of Austria-Hungary, 1910

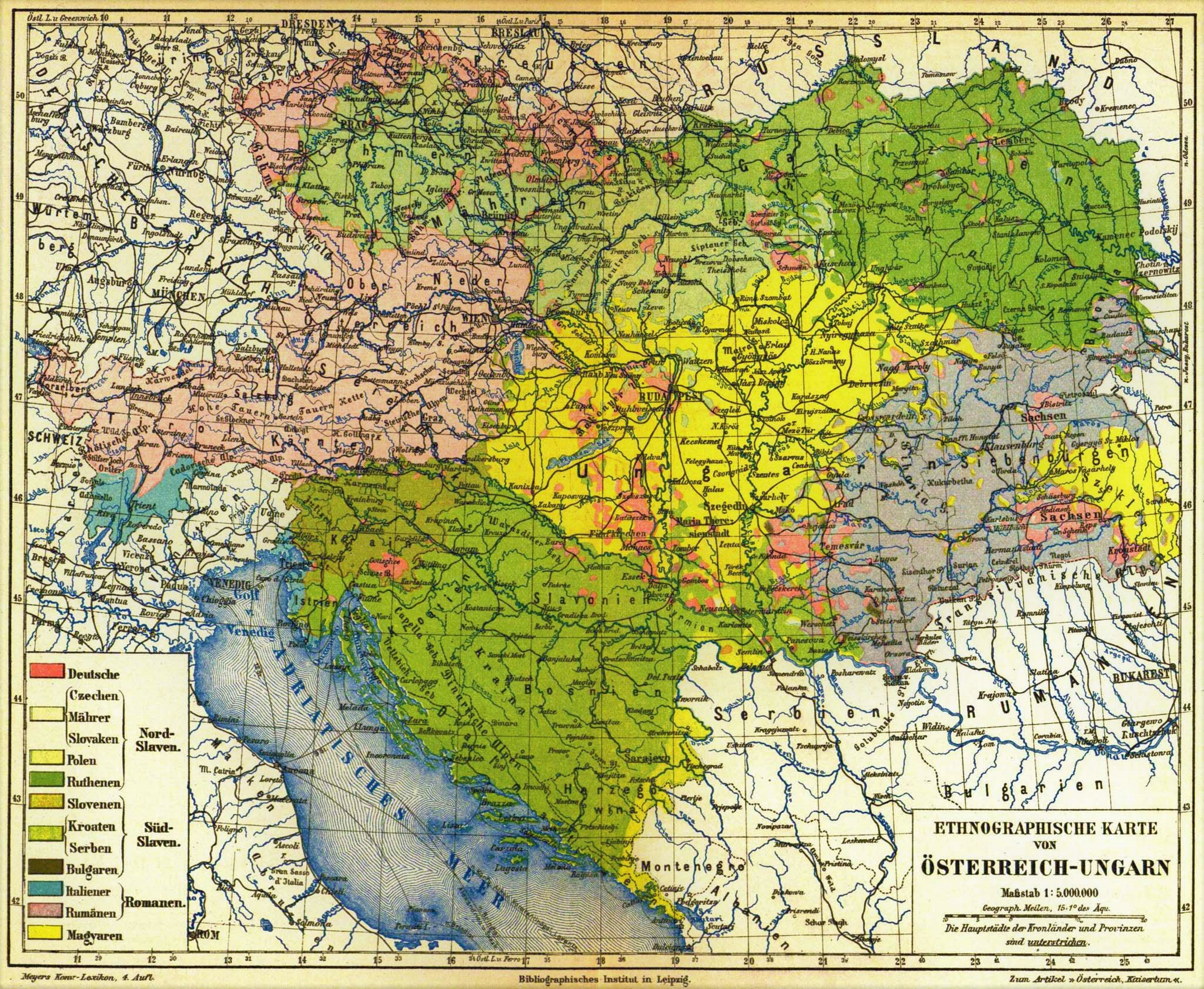
Meyers Konversations-Lexikon ethnographic map of Austria-Hungary, 1885

In July 1849, the Hungarian Revolutionary Parliament proclaimed and enacted ethnic and minority rights (the next such laws were in Switzerland), but these were overturned after the Russian and Austrian armies crushed the Hungarian Revolution. After the Kingdom of Hungary reached the Compromise with the Habsburg Dynasty in 1867, one of the first acts of its restored Parliament was to pass a Law on Nationalities (Act Number XLIV of 1868). It was a liberal piece of legislation and offered extensive language and cultural rights. It did not recognize non-Hungarians to have rights to form states with any territorial autonomy.

Article 19 of the 1867 "Basic State Act" (Staatsgrundgesetz), valid only for the Cisleithanian (Austrian) part of Austria–Hungary, said:

All races of the empire have equal rights, and every race has an inviolable right to the preservation and use of its own nationality and language. The equality of all customary languages ("landesübliche Sprachen") in school, office and public life, is recognized by the state. In those territories in which several races dwell, the public and educational institutions are to be so arranged that, without applying compulsion to learn a second country language ("Landessprache"), each of the races receives the necessary means of education in its own language.

The implementation of this principle led to several disputes, as it was not clear which languages could be regarded as "customary". The Germans, the traditional bureaucratic, capitalist and cultural elite, demanded the recognition of their language as a customary language in every part of the empire. German nationalists, especially in the Sudetenland (part of Bohemia), looked to Berlin in the new German Empire.

The Hungarian Minority Act of 1868 gave the minorities (Slovaks, Romanians, Serbs, et al.) individual (but not also communal) rights to use their language in offices, schools (although in practice often only in those founded by them and not by the state), courts and municipalities (if 20% of the deputies demanded it). Beginning with the 1879 Primary Education Act and the 1883 Secondary Education Act, the Hungarian state made more efforts to reduce the use of non-Magyar languages, in strong violation of the 1868 Nationalities Law. After 1875, all Slovak language schools higher than elementary were closed, including the only three high schools (gymnasiums) in Revúca (Nagyrőce), Turčiansky Svätý Martin (Turócszentmárton) and Kláštor pod Znievom (Znióváralja).

Language was, as a proxy for ethnicity, one of the most contentious issues in Austro-Hungarian politics. All governments faced difficult and divisive hurdles in deciding on the languages of government and of instruction. The minorities sought the widest opportunities for education in their own languages, as well as in the "dominant" languages—Hungarian and German. By the "Ordinance of 5 April 1897", the Austrian Prime Minister Count Kasimir Felix Badeni gave Czech equal standing with German in the internal government of Bohemia; this led to a crisis because of nationalist German agitation throughout the empire. The Crown dismissed Badeni.

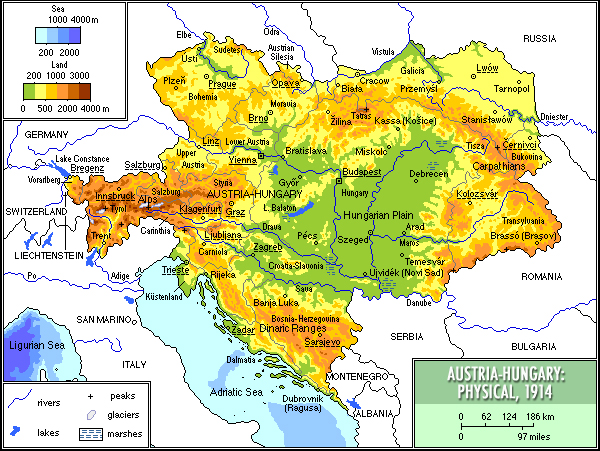
Topographic map of Austria-Hungary in 1914

Italian was regarded as an old "culture language" (Kultursprache) by German intellectuals and had always been granted equal rights as an official language of the Empire, but the Germans had difficulty in accepting the Slavic languages as equal to their own. On one occasion Count A. Auersperg (Anastasius Grün) entered the Diet of Carniola carrying what he claimed to be the whole corpus of Slovene literature under his arm; this was to demonstrate that the Slovene language could not be substituted for German as the language of higher education.

The following years saw official recognition of several languages, at least in Austria. Since 1867, laws awarded Croatian equal status with Italian in Dalmatia. Beginning in 1882, there was a Slovene majority in the Diet of Carniola and in the capital Laibach (Ljubljana); they replaced German with Slovene as their primary official language. Galicia designated Polish instead of German in 1869 as the customary language of government.

As of June 1907, all public and private schools in Hungary were obliged to ensure that after the fourth grade, the pupils could express themselves fluently in Hungarian. This led to the further closing of minority schools, devoted mostly to the Slovak and Rusyn languages. The two kingdoms sometimes divided their spheres of influence. According to Misha Glenny in his book, The Balkans, 1804–1999, the Austrians responded to Hungarian support of Czechs by supporting the Croatian national movement in Zagreb. In recognition that he reigned in a multi-ethnic country, Emperor Franz Joseph spoke (and used) German, Hungarian and Czech fluently, and Croatian, Serbian, Polish and Italian to some degree.

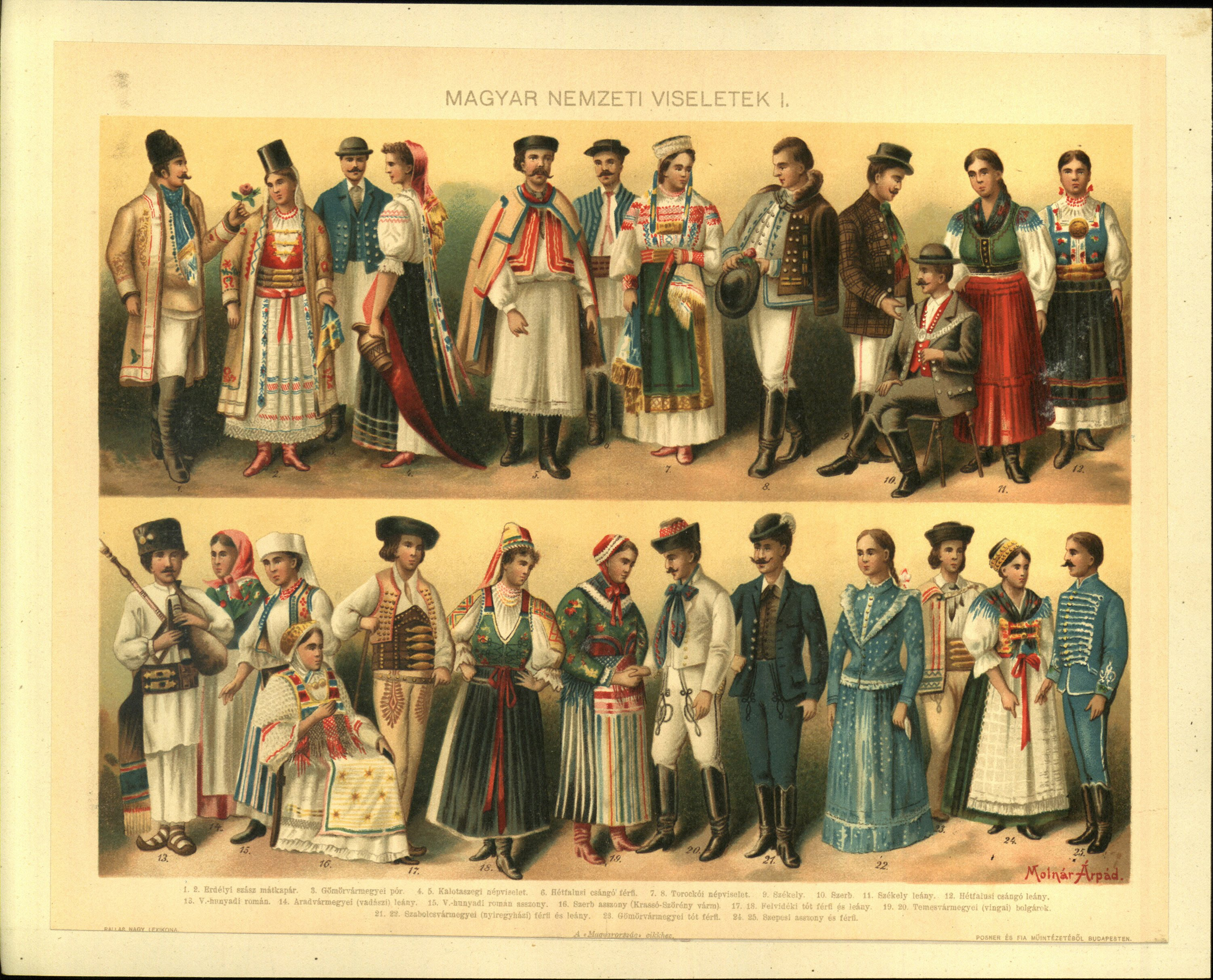
Traditional clothing of various ethnic groups in Hungary, late 19th century

The language disputes were most fiercely fought in Bohemia, where the Czech speakers formed a majority and sought equal status for their language to German. The Czechs had lived primarily in Bohemia since the 6th century and German immigrants had begun settling the Bohemian periphery in the 13th century. The constitution of 1627 made the German language a second official language and equal to Czech. German speakers lost their majority in the Bohemian Diet in 1880 and became a minority to Czech speakers in the cities of Prague and Pilsen (while retaining a slight numerical majority in the city of Brno (Brünn)). The old Charles University in Prague, hitherto dominated by German speakers, was divided into German and Czech-speaking faculties in 1882.

At the same time, Hungarian dominance faced challenges from majority populated areas of Romanians, Slovaks and Serbs. The Romanians and the Serbs began to agitate for union with their fellow nationalists and language speakers in the newly founded states of Romania (1859–1878) and Serbia.

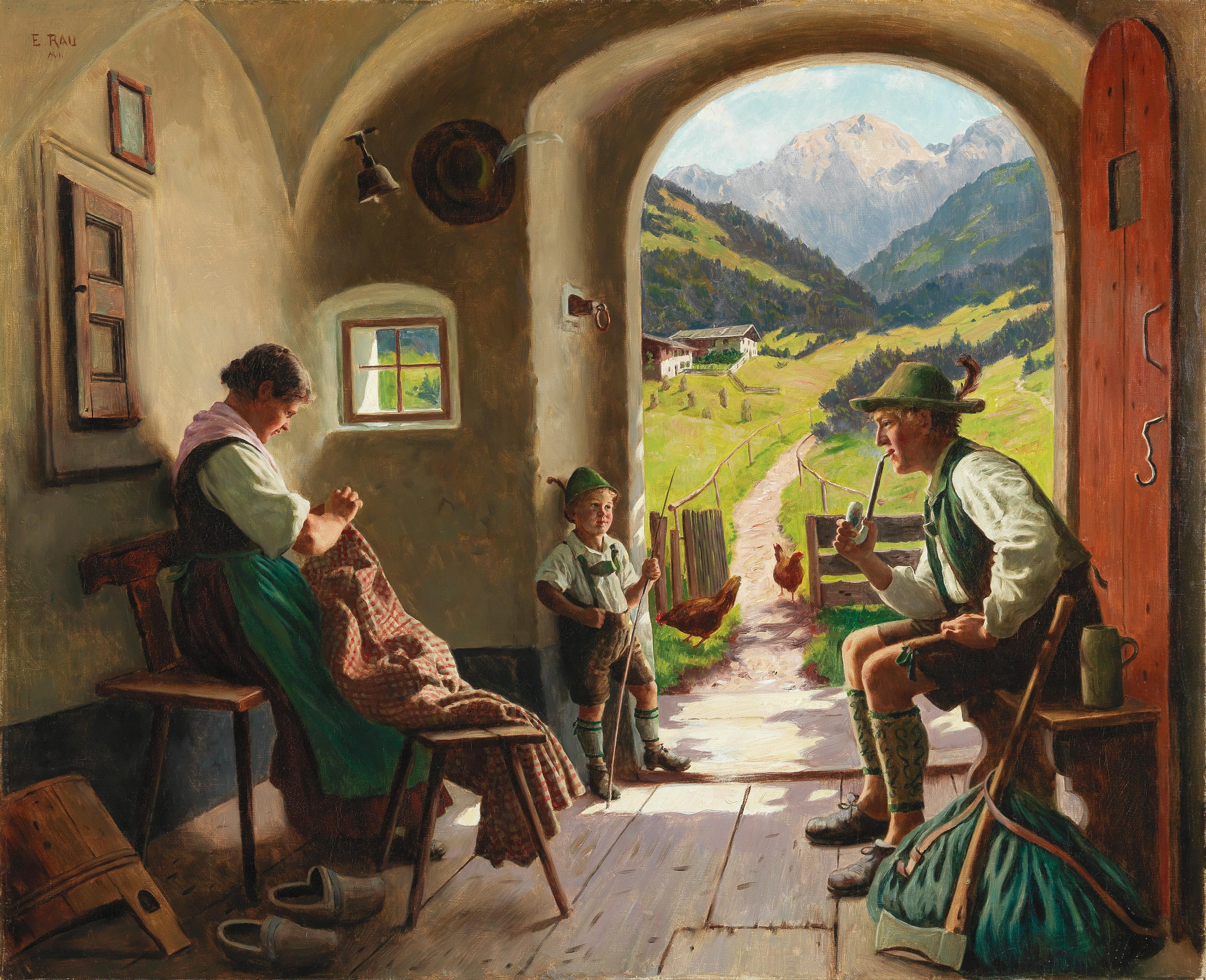
Traditional costumes of Tyrol

Hungary's leaders were generally less willing than their Austrian counterparts to share power with their subject minorities, but they granted a large measure of autonomy to Croatia in 1868. To some extent, they modeled their relationship to that kingdom on their own compromise with Austria of the previous year. In spite of nominal autonomy, the Croatian government was an economic and administrative part of Hungary, which the Croatians resented. In the Kingdom of Croatia-Slavonia and Bosnia and Herzegovina many advocated the idea of a trialist Austro-Hungaro-Croatian monarchy; among the supporters of the idea were Archduke Leopold Salvator, Archduke Franz Ferdinand and emperor and king Charles I who during his short reign supported the trialist idea only to be vetoed by the Hungarian government and Count István Tisza. The count finally signed the trialist proclamation after heavy pressure from the king on 23 October 1918.

=== Ethnic relations ===
In Istria, the Istro-Romanians, a small ethnic group composed by around 2,600 people in the 1880s, suffered severe discrimination. The Croats of the region, who formed the majority, tried to assimilate them, while the Italian minority supported them in their requests for self-determination. In 1888, the possibility of opening the first school for the Istro-Romanians teaching in the Romanian language was discussed in the Diet of Istria. The proposal was very popular among them. The Italian deputies showed their support, but the Croat ones opposed it and tried to show that the Istro-Romanians were in fact Slavs. During Austro-Hungarian rule, the Istro-Romanians lived under poverty conditions, and those living in the island of Krk were fully assimilated by 1875.

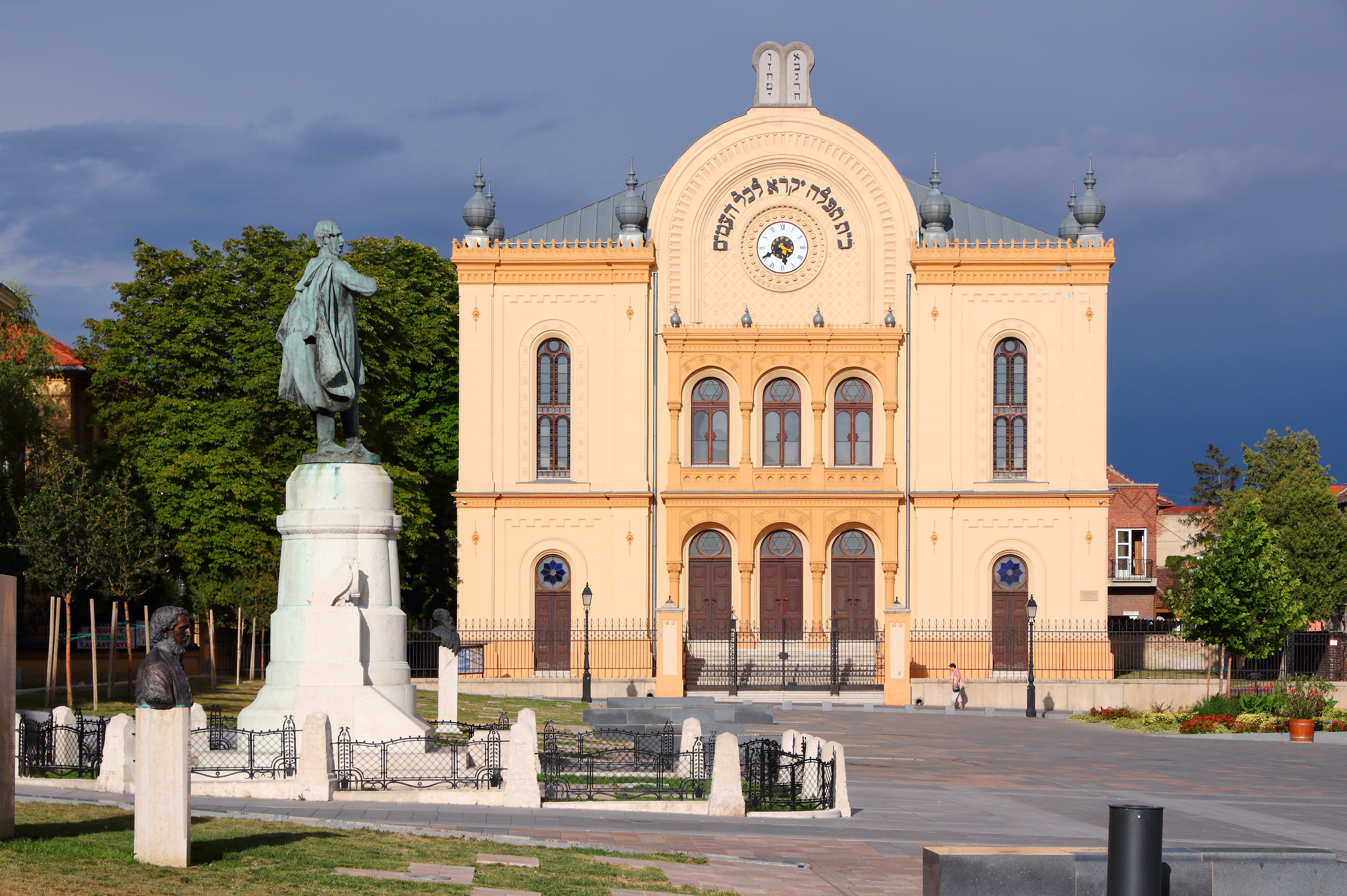
Romantic-style Great Synagogue in Pécs, built by the Neolog Jewish community in 1869

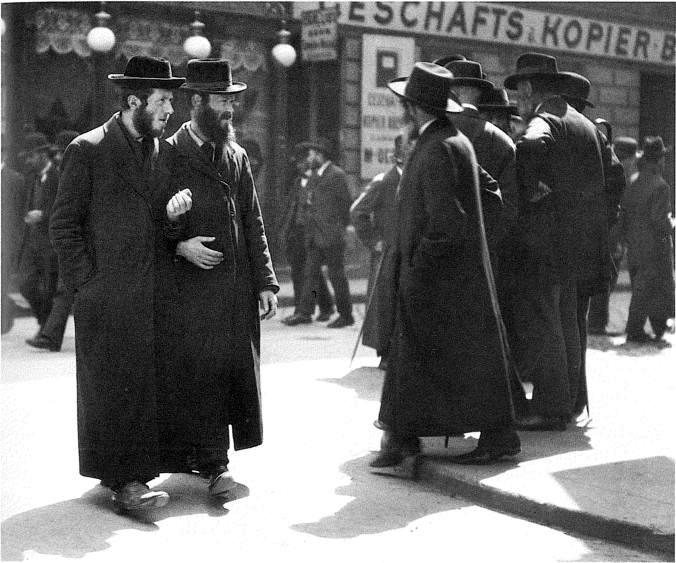
Orthodox Jews from Galicia in Leopoldstadt, Vienna, 1915

Around 1900, Jews numbered about two million in the whole territory of the Austro-Hungarian Empire; their position was ambiguous. The populist and antisemitic politics of the Christian Social Party are sometimes viewed as a model for Adolf Hitler's Nazism. Antisemitic parties and movements existed, but the governments of Vienna and Budapest did not initiate pogroms or implement official antisemitic policies. They feared that such ethnic violence could ignite other ethnic minorities and escalate out of control. The antisemitic parties remained on the periphery of the political sphere due to their low popularity among voters in the parliamentary elections.

In that period, the majority of Jews in Austria–Hungary lived in small towns (shtetls) in Galicia and rural areas in Hungary and Bohemia; however, they had large communities and even local majorities in the downtown districts of Vienna, Budapest, Prague, Kraków and Lwów. Of the pre-World War I military forces of the major European powers, the Austro-Hungarian army was almost alone in its regular promotion of Jews to positions of command. While the Jewish population of the lands of the Dual Monarchy was about 5%, Jews made up nearly 18% of the reserve officer corps. Thanks to the modernity of the constitution and to the benevolence of emperor Franz Joseph, the Austrian Jews came to regard the era of Austria–Hungary as a golden era of their history. By 1910 about 900,000 religious Jews made up approximately 5% of the population of Hungary and about 23% of Budapest's citizenry. In the Austro-Hungarian Empire the generally fiercely patriotic Hungarian Jews were securing the tenuous Hungarian majority in the Kingdom of Hungary. (Note: From 45.5% to 50.4%.) Jews accounted for 54% of commercial business owners, 85% of financial institution directors and owners in banking, and 62% of all employees in commerce, 20% of all general grammar school students, and 37% of all commercial scientific grammar school students, 31.9% of all engineering students, and 34.1% of all students in human faculties of the universities. Jews accounted for 48.5% of all physicians, and 49.4% of all lawyers/jurists in Hungary. Note: The numbers of Jews were reconstructed from religious censuses. They did not include the people of Jewish origin who had converted to Christianity, or the number of atheists. Among many Hungarian parliament members of Jewish origin, the most famous Jewish members in Hungarian political life were Minister of Justice Vilmos Vázsonyi, Minister of War Samu Hazai, Minister of Finance János Teleszky, and ministers of trade János Harkányi and József Szterényi.

== Administrative division ==
Administrative divisions of Austria-Hungary
1. Bohemia
2. Bukovina
3. Carinthia
4. Carniola
5. Dalmatia
6. Galicia and Lodomeria
7. Austrian Littoral
8. Lower Austria
9. Moravia
10. Salzburg
11. Austrian Silesia
12. Styria
13. Tyrol
14. Upper Austria
15. Vorarlberg
16. Kingdom of Hungary (including Vojvodina and Transylvania)
17. Croatia and Slavonia

18. Bosnia and Herzegovina

In political terms, Austria-Hungary was divided into two parts: the Austrian lands, officially called the “Kingdoms and Lands Represented in the Imperial Council” (die im Reichsrate vertretenen Königreiche und Länder), governed through the Imperial Council (Reichsrat), and the Kingdom of Hungary, which included the historic lands of the Hungarian Crown and was subordinate to the Hungarian parliament and government.

Informally, these two parts were referred to as Cisleithania and Transleithania respectively. The annexed Condominium of Bosnia and Herzegovina in 1908 was not included in either Cisleithania or Transleithania and was administered by special governing authorities.

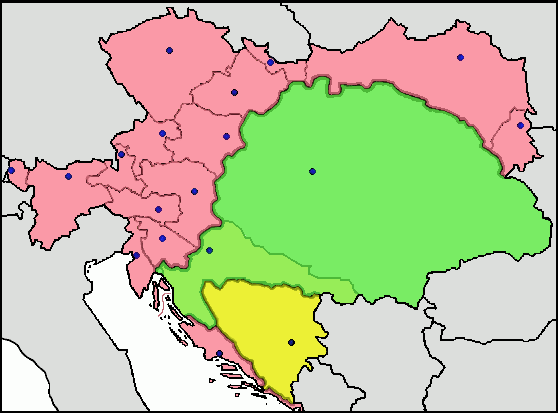
Austria-Hungary in 1878–1918: Cisleithania (Austrian part of the empire) Transleithania (Hungarian part of the empire) Condominium of Bosnia and Herzegovina (under joint administration from 1908)

In administrative terms, Austria-Hungary was divided into the following constituent parts (Crown Lands).

No.	Land	Capital
1	Cisleithania (Austrian Crown lands)	
1.1	Archduchy of Lower Austria (Erzherzogtum Österreich unter der Enns)	Vienna (Wien)
1.2	Archduchy of Upper Austria (Erzherzogtum Österreich ob der Enns)	Linz (Linz)
1.3	Duchy of Salzburg (Herzogtum Salzburg)	Salzburg (Salzburg)
1.4	Duchy of Styria (Herzogtum Steiermark)	Graz (Graz)
1.5	Duchy of Carinthia (Herzogtum Kärnten)	Klagenfurt (Klagenfurt)
1.6	Duchy of Carniola (Herzogtum Krain)	Ljubljana (Laibach)
1.7	Austrian Littoral	Trieste (Triest)
1.7.1	Princely County of Gorizia and Gradisca (Gefürstete Grafschaft Görz und Gradisca)	Gorizia (Görz)
1.7.2	Imperial Free City of Trieste (Reichsunmittelbare Stadt Triest und ihr Gebiet)	Trieste (Triest)
1.7.3	Margraviate of Istria (Markgrafschaft Istrien)	Poreč (Parenz)
1.8	Princely County of Tyrol (Gefürstete Grafschaft Tirol)	Innsbruck (Innsbruck)
1.9	Land of Vorarlberg (Land Vorarlberg)	Bregenz (Bregenz)
1.10	Kingdom of Bohemia (Königreich Böhmen)	Prague (Prag)
1.11	Margraviate of Moravia (Markgrafschaft Mähren)	Brno (Brünn)
1.12	Duchy of Austrian Silesia (Herzogtum Schlesien (Österreichisch-Schlesien))	Opava (Troppau)
1.13	Kingdom of Galicia and Lodomeria	Lviv (Lemberg)
1.14	Duchy of Bukovina	Chernivtsi (Czernowitz)
1.15	Kingdom of Dalmatia	Zadar (Zadar)
2	Transleithania (lands of the Hungarian Crown)	
2.1	Kingdom of Hungary	Budapest (Budapest)
2.2	Kingdom of Croatia-Slavonia	Zagreb (Agram)
2.3	City of Fiume	Rijeka (Sankt Veit an der Flaum)
3	Condominium of Bosnia and Herzegovina (from 1908)	Sarajevo (Sarajevo)

Map of the Leitha River showing the border between Cisleithania and Transleithania (coloured), as well as modern borders (black)

The representative bodies of the constituent parts (Hungary and Croatia) were the regional diets (Landtage), while the executive authorities were the regional governments, consisting of a regional prime minister and regional ministers.

The emperor in the crown lands was represented by the Statthalterei (Statthalterei). The representative bodies of the crown lands were the regional diets (Landtage), while the executive authorities were the regional committees (Landesausschuss), headed by the regional governor (Landeshauptmann) and regional councillors (Landesräte).

At district level, the imperial administration was represented by district captaincies (Bezirkshauptmannschaften). In cities, the representative bodies were municipal councils (Gemeinderäte), and the executive bodies were city councils (Stadträte), consisting of a mayor (Bürgermeister) and city councillors (Stadträte).

In municipalities, the representative bodies were municipal assemblies (Gemeindevertretungen), while the executive bodies were municipal committees (Gemeindeausschüsse), consisting of a mayor and municipal councillors.

== Education ==
=== Universities in Cisleithania ===
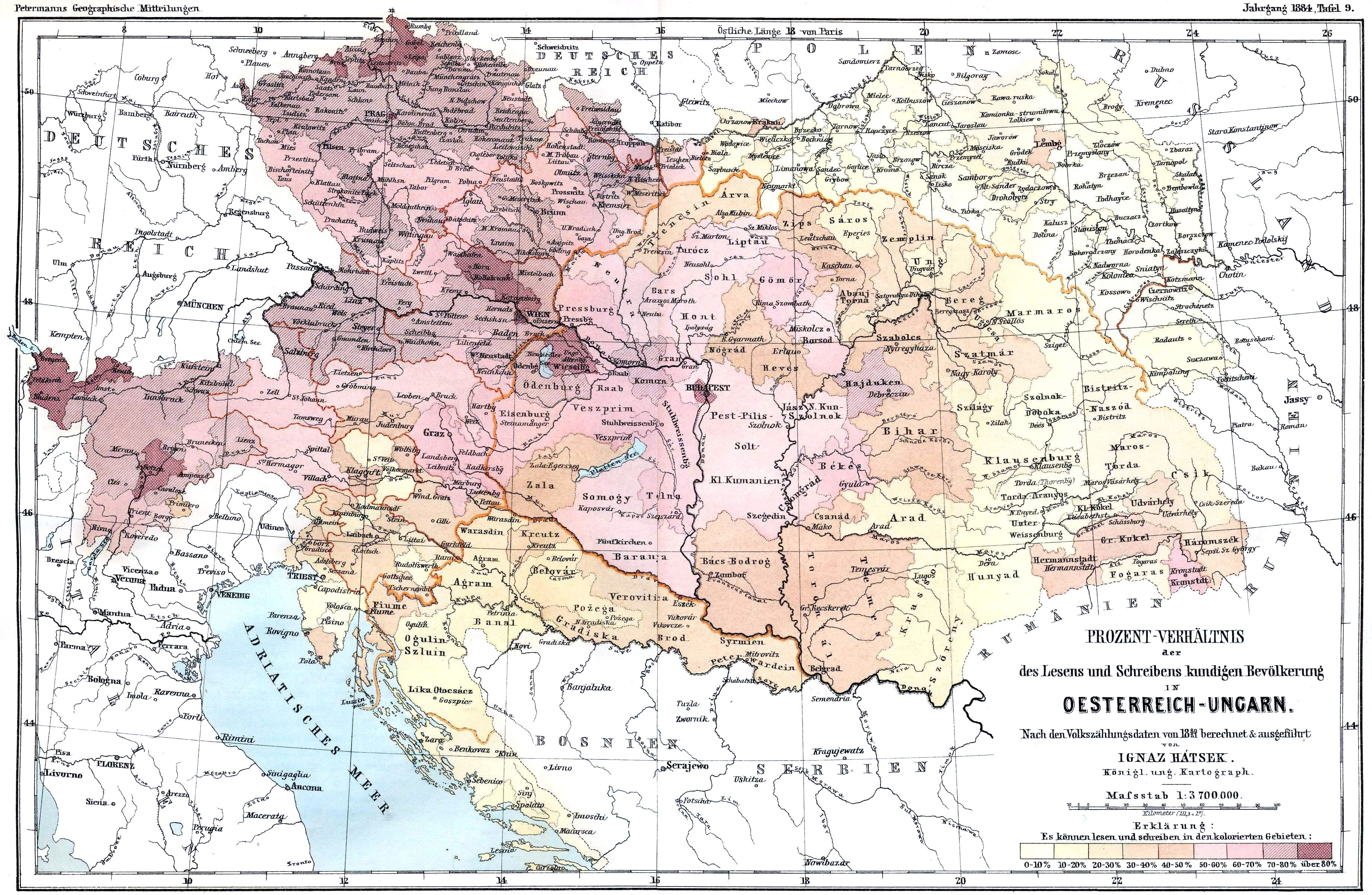
Literacy in Austria-Hungary (census 1880)

The first university in the Austrian half of the Empire (Charles University) was founded by Emperor Charles IV in Prague in 1347, the second oldest university was the Jagiellonian University established in Kraków by the King of Poland Casimir III the Great in 1364, while the third oldest (University of Vienna) was founded by Duke Rudolph IV in 1365.

The higher educational institutions were predominantly German, but beginning in the 1870s, language shifts began to occur. These establishments, which in the middle of the 19th century were predominantly of German character, underwent in Galicia a conversion into Polish national institutions, in Bohemia and Moravia a separation into German and Czech ones. Thus Germans, Czechs and Poles were provided for. But the smaller nations also made their voices heard: the Ruthenians, Slovenes and Italians. The Ruthenians demanded at first, in view of the predominantly Ruthenian character of rural East Galicia, a national partition of the Polish University of Lwów. Since the Poles were at first unyielding, Ruthenian demonstrations and strikes of students arose, and the Ruthenians were no longer content with the reversion of a few separate professorial chairs, and with parallel courses of lectures. By a pact concluded on 28 January 1914 the Poles promised a Ruthenian university; but owing to the war the question lapsed. The Italians could hardly claim a university on grounds of population (in 1910 they numbered 783,000), but they claimed it all the more on grounds of their ancient culture. All parties were agreed that an Italian faculty of laws should be created; the difficulty lay in the choice of the place. The Italians demanded Trieste; but the government was afraid to let this Adriatic port become the centre of an irredenta; moreover the Southern Slavs of the city wished it kept free from an Italian university. Prime minister Richard von Bienerth in 1910 extended a compromise for it to be situated at once, provisionally in Vienna, and to be transferred within four years to Italian national territory. The German National Union (Nationalverband) agreed to the temporary hospitality for the Italian university in Vienna, but the Southern Slav Hochschule Club demanded a guarantee that a later transfer to the coast provinces should not be allowed, together with the simultaneous foundation of Slovene professorial chairs in Prague and Kraków, and preliminary steps towards the foundation of a Southern Slav university in Laibach (Ljubljana). But in spite of the constant renewal of negotiations for a compromise it was impossible to arrive at any agreement, until the outbreak of war left all the projects for a Ruthenian university at Lwów, a Slovene one in Laibach, and a second Czech one in Moravia, unrealized.

=== Universities in Transleithania ===
Literacy in Hungary by counties in 1910 (excluding Croatia)

In the year 1276, the university of Veszprém was destroyed by the troops of Peter I Csák and it was never rebuilt. A university was established by Louis I of Hungary in Pécs in 1367. Sigismund established a university at Óbuda in 1395. Another, Universitas Istropolitana, was established 1465 in Pozsony (Bratislava in Slovakia) by Mattias Corvinus. None of these medieval universities survived the Ottoman wars. Nagyszombat University was founded in 1635 and moved to Buda in 1777 where it is called Eötvös Loránd University. The world's first institute of technology was founded in Selmecbánya, Kingdom of Hungary (since 1920 Banská Štiavnica, Slovakia) in 1735. Its legal successor is the University of Miskolc in Hungary. The Budapest University of Technology and Economics (BME) is considered the oldest institute of technology in the world with university rank and structure. Its legal predecessor the Institutum Geometrico-Hydrotechnicum was founded in 1782 by Emperor Joseph II.

The high schools included the universities, of which Hungary possessed five, all maintained by the state: at Budapest (founded in 1635), at Kolozsvár (founded in 1872), and at Zagreb (founded in 1874). Newer universities were established in Debrecen in 1912, and Pozsony university was reestablished after a half millennium in 1912. They had four faculties: theology, law, philosophy and medicine (the university at Zagreb was without a faculty of medicine). There were in addition ten high schools of law, called academies, which in 1900 were attended by 1,569 pupils. The Polytechnicum in Budapest, founded in 1844, which contained four faculties and was attended in 1900 by 1,772 pupils, was also considered a high school. There were in Hungary in 1900 forty-nine theological colleges, twenty-nine Catholic, five Greek Uniat, four Greek Orthodox, ten Protestant and one Jewish. Among special schools the principal mining schools were at Selmeczbánya, Nagyág and Felsőbánya; the principal agricultural colleges at Debreczen and Kolozsvár; and there was a school of forestry at Selmeczbánya, military colleges at Budapest, Kassa, Déva and Zagreb, and the Imperial and Royal Naval Academy at Fiume. There were in addition a number of training institutes for teachers and a large number of schools of commerce, several art schools – for design, painting, sculpture, and music.

Literacy in Kingdom of Hungary, incl. male and female
Major nationalities in Hungary	Rate of literacy in 1910
German	70.7%
Hungarian	67.1%
Croatian	62.5%
Slovak	58.1%
Serbian	51.3%
Romanian	28.2%
Ruthenian	22.2%

=== Notable scientists of Austria-Hungary ===
Scientists of various nationalities who lived and received their education in Austria-Hungary made a significant contribution to the development of various fields of world science. Notable figures in science include:

- Germans (Austrians): physicist Ludwig Boltzmann, physicist and philosopher Ernst Mach, geologist Eduard Suess, physicist Christian Doppler, zoologist Konrad Lorenz, physicist Erwin Schrödinger and Victor Franz Hess, philosopher Ludwig Wittgenstein, physicist Lise Meitner, physicist Franz Serafin Exner, physicist Johann Josef Loschmidt, engineer and inventor Viktor Kaplan, philosopher Alexius Meinong, physician Julius Wagner-Jauregg, and many others.
- Hungarians: obstetrician Ignaz Semmelweis, physician Mór Kaposi, physicist Loránd Eötvös, engineer Ányos István Jedlik, physicist Leó Szilárd, chemist George de Hevesy, biochemist Albert Szent-Györgyi;
- Czechs and Slovaks: biologist and geneticist Gregor Mendel, biologist Jan Evangelista Purkyně, mathematician Eduard Čech, chemist Zdenko Hans Skraup, philosopher, sociologist and future President of Czechoslovakia Tomáš Garrigue Masaryk, chemist Jaroslav Heyrovský, engineer František Křižík, astronomer Milan Rastislav Štefánik, engineer Aurele Boleslav Stodola, engineers and inventors Jozef Murgaš and Ján Bahýľ, inventor Štefan Banič;
- Poles: mathematician Stefan Banach, physicist Marian Smoluchowski, chemists Karol Stanisław Olszewski and Zygmunt Florenty Wróblewski, physiologist Napoleon Cybulski, bacteriologist Rudolf Weigl, mathematician Hugo Steinhaus, ethnographer Oskar Kolberg, philosophers of the Lwów–Warsaw school (Kazimierz Twardowski, Jan Łukasiewicz, Kazimierz Ajdukiewicz, Tadeusz Kotarbiński, and others).
- Ukrainians: physicist Ivan Puluj, biochemist Ivan Horbachevsky, mathematician Volodymyr Levytskyi, geographer Stepan Rudnytskyi;
- Slovenians: mathematician and physicist Jožef Stefan, chemist and physician Fritz Pregl;
- Serbs and Croats: physicist and inventor Nikola Tesla, physicist Mihajlo Pupin, astronomer, climatologist and geophysicist Milutin Milanković, geologist Andrija Mohorovičić, chemist Franjo Hanaman, geologist and paleontologist Dragutin Gorjanović-Kramberger;
- Romanians: biologist Victor Babeș, aircraft designer Aurel Vlaicu;
- Jews: chemist and immunologist Karl Landsteiner, psychologist Sigmund Freud, otorhinolaryngologist Robert Bárány.

=== Notable travelers and explorers ===
Austro-Hungarian travelers and explorers made a significant contribution to the development of the geographical sciences. For example, Austro-Hungarian explorers Samuel Teleki and Ludwig von Höhnel were among the first Europeans to explore large parts of the East African Rift Valley and attempted to climb Mount Kilimanjaro, the highest peak in Africa. Teleki himself became the first person to reach the snow line on Kilimanjaro at an altitude of 5,300 meters, and later the first explorer to set foot on Mount Kenya, ascending to an elevation of 4,300 meters. The Austrian explorer Oscar Baumann was the first European to visit the territory of present-day Rwanda. Further contributions to the exploration of the African continent were made by Ludwig Purtscheller (who, together with the German alpinist Hans Meyer, was the first to successfully summit Kilimanjaro), Friedrich Bieber (an explorer of Ethiopia), Rudolf Carl von Slatin (an Austrian officer in British service who became the Egyptian governor of the province of Darfur in the Turco-Egyptian Sudan and later Inspector-General in the Anglo-Egyptian Sudan), and Friedrich Welwitsch (a botanist and explorer who discovered the plant Welwitschia, named after him).

In 1871–1874, the Austrian sailors Julius Payer and Karl Weyprecht undertook a polar expedition aboard the ship Admiral Tegetthoff, during which the archipelago later named Franz Josef Land was discovered and explored. The names given by the expedition members to the newly discovered lands commemorated members of the Austrian imperial family, figures of Austrian science, and individuals involved in organizing the expedition. These included Emperor Franz Joseph I, Crown Prince Rudolf (Rudolf Island), the cartographer August von Fligely (Cape Fligely—the northernmost point of Russia and of Eurasia), Josef Johann Michael Franz Hieronymus Rainer (Rainer Island), Franz Kuhn (Kuhn Island), Johann Nepomuk Wilczek (Wilczek Island), and others.

== Culture ==
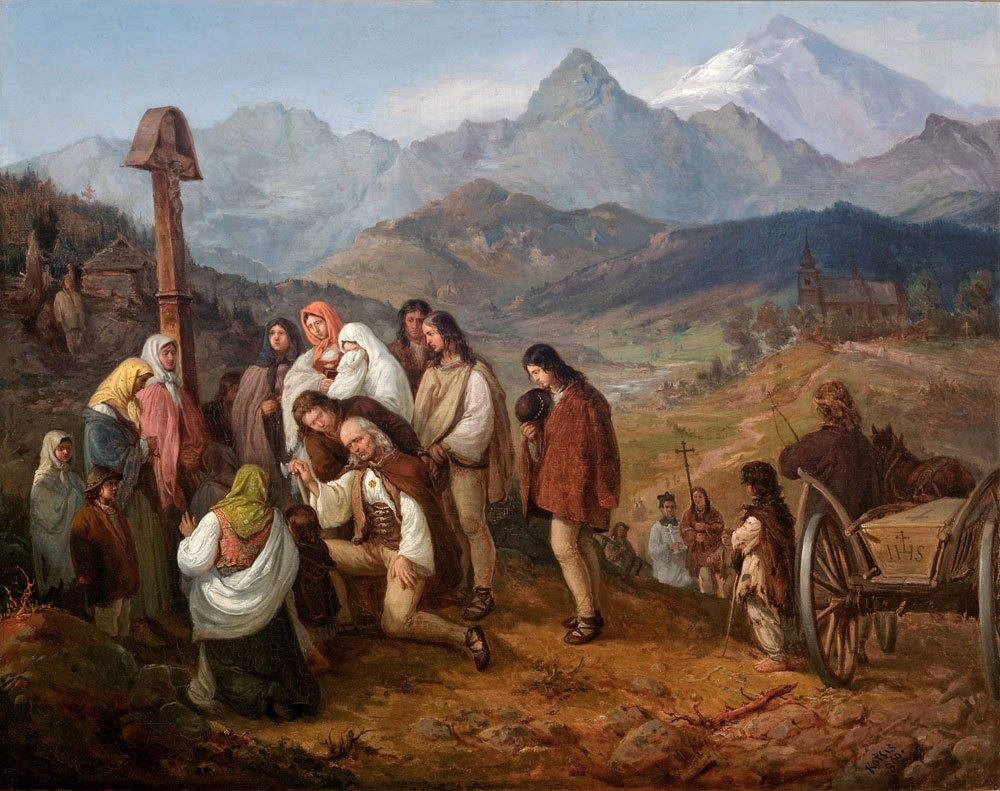
A Highlander's Funeral (1860) by Polish painter Aleksander Kotsis, depicting a Podhale Gorál funeral in the Tatra Mountains

Numerous cultural landmarks were created during the Austro-Hungarian period. Austria-Hungary was one of the centers of European Modernism. The association of artists later known as the Vienna Secession had a significant impact on European and global art. Many buildings constructed at that time continue to largely define the architectural character of the cities that were then part of the empire. Several cities across the former Austro-Hungarian Empire were often referred to as "Little Vienna" due to their architectural style, urban planning, and cultural life reflecting that of the imperial capital; among them were Bielsko-Biała, Lviv, Chernivtsi, Zagreb, Trieste, Cluj-Napoca, Timișoara, Graz, and Prague, where Ringstrasse-style boulevards, historicist architecture, and vibrant café culture mirrored Viennese models. The architectural firm Fellner & Helmer, established in Vienna by architects Ferdinand Fellner and Hermann Helmer, designed projects according to which 48 theatre buildings were constructed across Eastern Europe, including the Odessa Opera and Ballet Theatre. Michael Thonet, who moved to Austria in 1842 and lived in Vienna for the rest of his life, was the inventor of Viennese bentwood furniture.

=== Art, architecture, and sculpture ===
A substantial contribution to European culture, as well as to the cultures of the states that emerged after the dissolution of Austria-Hungary, was also made by artists, sculptors, and architects who were born, educated, and formed as cultural figures within the Habsburg Empire. Among them were:

- Germans: painters Gustav Klimt, Egon Schiele, and Koloman Moser; architects Otto Wagner, Adolf Loos, and Josef Hoffmann; sculptors Anton Hanak and Richard Luksch;
- Czechs: painters Alphonse Mucha, František Kupka, Oskar Kokoschka, and Antonín Slavíček; architects Jan Kotěra and Josef Gočár; sculptors Stanislav Sucharda and Josef Václav Myslbek;
- Slovaks: painters Peter Michal Bohúň, László Mednyánszky, and Mikuláš Galanda; sculptor Ján Koniarek; architect Dušan Jurkovič;
- Hungarians: painters Mihály Munkácsy, Károly Ferenczy, and Tivadar Csontváry Kosztka; architects Ödön Lechner, Imre Steindl, and Béla Lajta; sculptors Alajos Stróbl and Zsigmond Kisfaludi Strobl;
- Italians: painters Giovanni Segantini, Umberto Veruda, and Carlo Wostry; sculptor Attilio Selva; architect Max Fabiani;
- Poles: painters Jan Matejko, Jacek Malczewski, Józef Mehoffer, and Stanisław Wyspiański (the latter also a writer); sculptors Xawery Dunikowski and Konstanty Laszczka; architect Teodor Talowski;
- Slovenes: Impressionist painters Ivan Grohar, Rihard Jakopič, Matej Sternen, and Matija Jama; sculptors Franc Berneker and Lojze Dolinar; architect Jože Plečnik;
- Croats: painters Vlaho Bukovac and Bela Čikoš Sesija; sculptors Ivan Meštrović, Robert Frangeš-Mihanović, Rudolf Valdec, and Ivan Rendić; architects Viktor Kovačić and Herman Bollé;
- Serbs: painters Paja Jovanović, Uroš Predić, and Stevan Aleksić; sculptor Toma Rosandić; architects Svetozar Ivačković, Dragiša Brašovan, and Branko Tanazević;
- Romanians and Transylvanian Hungarians: painter Octavian Smigelschi, sculptor Cornel Medrea, and architect Károly Kós;
- Ukrainians: painters Ivan Trush, Oleksa Novakivskyi, Adalbert Erdeli, Modest Sosenko and Teofil Kopystynskyi; architects Ivan Levynskyi, Vasyl Nahirnyi, and Oleksandr Lushpynskyi; sculptor Mykhailo Parashchuk.

=== Music ===
Composers of the Austro-Hungarian period made a significant contribution to world music. Vienna, renowned as the “capital of music” since the time of Wolfgang Amadeus Mozart and Ludwig van Beethoven, continued to occupy a leading position both in academic music (represented by composers such as Anton Bruckner and Gustav Mahler) and in light and popular music (including the Viennese waltzes of the Strauss dynasty and operetta, as exemplified by Johann Strauss II and Franz Lehár). Arnold Schoenberg became the founder of atonal music and, as a result, one of the most influential composers of the twentieth century. The circle of Schoenberg's students and followers (including Anton Webern, Alban Berg, and others) became known as the Second Viennese School.

At the same time, the multiethnic empire was home to musical figures who became classics of their respective national cultures—Hungarians Béla Bartók, Zoltán Kodály, and the German-speaking Hungarian Franz Liszt (whose name is traditionally rendered in Hungarian form as Ferenc in several Eastern European cultures); Czechs Antonín Dvořák, Bedřich Smetana, and Leoš Janáček; the German composer of Slovene origin Hugo Wolf; the Croatian composer Ivan Zajc; the Romanian composer George Enescu (who studied at the Vienna Conservatory); and the Jewish composer Erich Wolfgang Korngold, who later achieved fame in Hollywood.

In the genre of operetta, notable figures included the Germans Franz von Suppé, Carl Millöcker, Carl Zeller, Leo Fall, and Carl Michael Ziehrer; the Czech composer Oskar Nedbal; and the Hungarians Imre Kálmán and Franz Lehár, whose works marked the Golden and Silver Age of Viennese operetta.

=== Literature ===
In the literary life of Austria-Hungary, representatives of all the peoples of the country took part. These included both German-language authors and writers working in their own languages, many of whom later became classics of literature in their newly formed states. Among the most well-known German-language authors of Austria-Hungary were Franz Kafka, Stefan Zweig, Hugo von Hofmannsthal, Arthur Schnitzler, Leopold von Sacher-Masoch, Rainer Maria Rilke, Joseph Roth, Max Brod, Franz Werfel, Hermann Broch, Nobel Peace Prize laureate Bertha von Suttner, and many others.

Writers who lived in Austria-Hungary and later became important figures in the culture and literature of their newly formed states include:

- Hungarians Sándor Petőfi, Mór Jókai, Endre Ady, Imre Madách, Dezső Kosztolányi, Gyula Krúdy, Ludwig Hevesi;
- Czechs Karel Čapek, Božena Němcová, Jaroslav Hašek, Jan Neruda, Alois Jirásek;
- Slovaks Pavol Országh Hviezdoslav, Jozef Gregor-Tajovský, Martin Kukučín;
- Poles Leopold Staff, Kazimierz Przerwa-Tetmajer, Stanisław Wyspiański, Bruno Schulz (the latter was a Polish-speaking Jew);
- Ukrainians Ivan Franko, Olha Kobylianska, Vasyl Stefanyk, Markiyan Shashkevych;
- Croats Ivan Mažuranić, August Šenoa, Miroslav Krleža;
- Serbs Ivo Andrić, Jovan Jovanović Zmaj, Svetozar Ćorović;
- Slovenes France Prešeren, Ivan Cankar, Oton Župančič, Josip Murn, Dragotin Kette;
- Romanians Mihai Eminescu (studied in Chernivtsi), Ioan Slavici, George Coșbuc;
- Italians Italo Svevo, Umberto Saba, Scipio Slataper (all from Trieste);
- German-speaking Jews Paul Celan, Rose Ausländer;
- Yiddish- and Hebrew-language Jewish writers Shmuel Yosef Agnon and others.

In addition to literature written directly during the Austria-Hungary era, there is also a body of later fictional and memoir literature addressing the themes of the empire's collapse and nostalgia for the Habsburg Monarchy (part of the so-called “Habsburg myth”, an idealised representation of Austria-Hungary during the era of Franz Joseph I). These works include writings by authors who experienced the dissolution of the country in 1918 (such as Franz Theodor Csokor, who wrote the play 3 November 1918 about the collapse of Austria-Hungary, and Friedrich Schreyvogl), as well as authors of later periods who addressed themes of loss of homeland, the collapse of a multiethnic world, nostalgia for the Habsburg Empire, and identity crisis.

Among such works are Job (1930), Radetzky March (1932), and The Emperor’s Tomb (1938) by Joseph Roth; The World of Yesterday (1942) by Stefan Zweig; The Man Without Qualities (1930–1943) by Robert Musil; the essay collection Danube (1986) by Claudio Magris; The Tongue Set Free (1977) by Elias Canetti; Memoirs of an Antisemite (1979) by Gregor von Rezzori; and The Sleepwalkers (1930–1932) by Hermann Broch.

In addition, there are authors who reflect in their work on the loss of Austria-Hungary as a homeland in specific regions, such as Joseph Zoderer, a German-language writer from South Tyrol, a region that passed to Italy after the war.

Among contemporary works addressing nostalgia for Austria-Hungary is the novel Felix Austria by Ukrainian writer Sofia Andrukhovych.

=== Cinema ===
The history of Austrian cinema also began within Austria-Hungary. In Vienna in 1896, the Lumière brothers presented the first moving pictures in Austria, and until the establishment of the first Austrian film companies in the late 1910s, early film production remained very modest and was largely dominated by French firms. During World War I, numerous newsreels were produced depicting events at the front in a patriotic tone and were subject to imperial censorship. A large number of propaganda films were also produced, and 1918—the final year of Habsburg rule—became the most productive year in the monarchy's film industry, with around 100 feature films made. In Austria-Hungary, in the town of Sucha (now Sucha Beskidzka in Poland), the American director Billy Wilder was born and raised; he later directed The Emperor Waltz, an operetta film set in early 20th-century Austria-Hungary.

== Economy ==
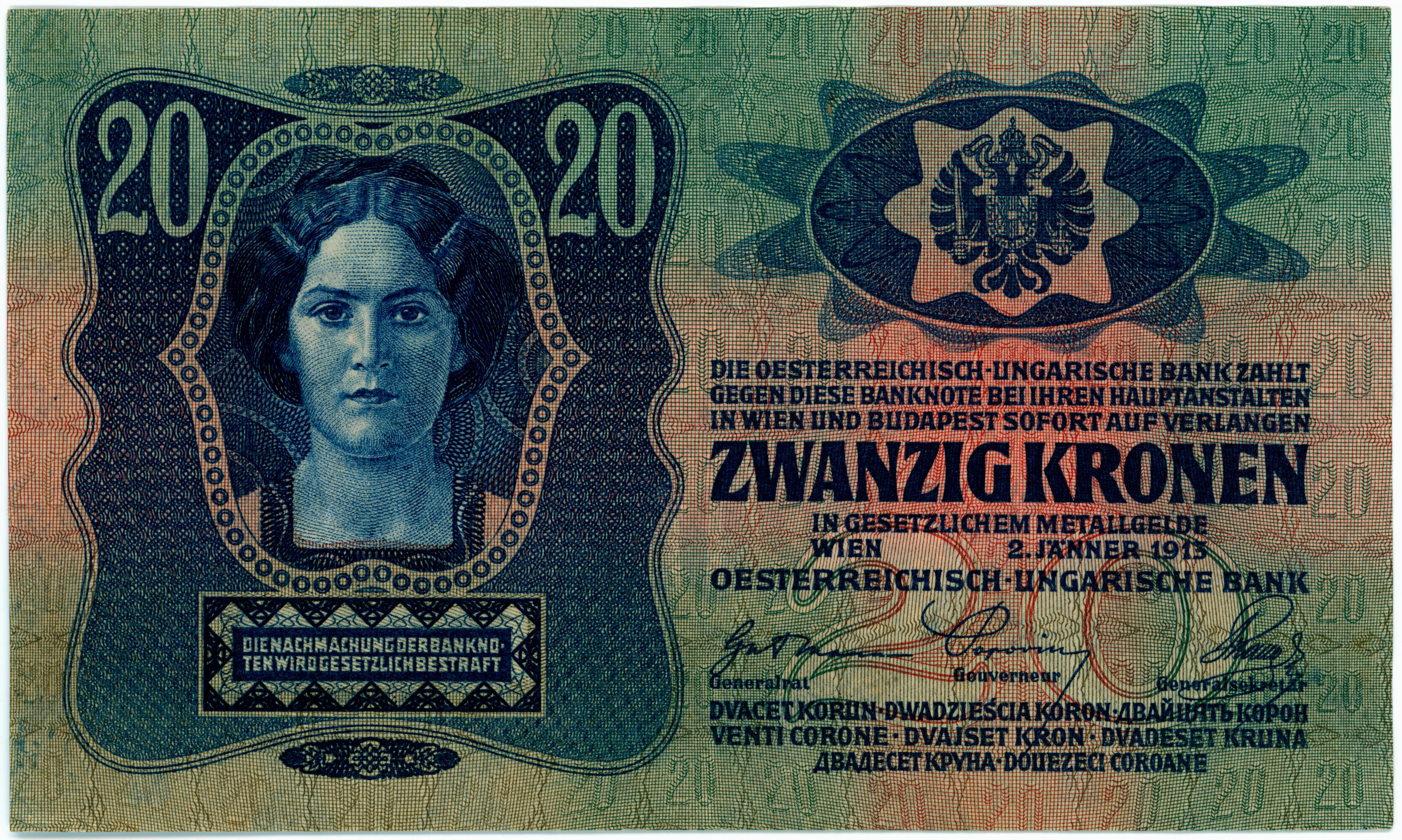
A 20-crown banknote of the Dual Monarchy, using all official and recognized languages (the reverse side was Hungarian)

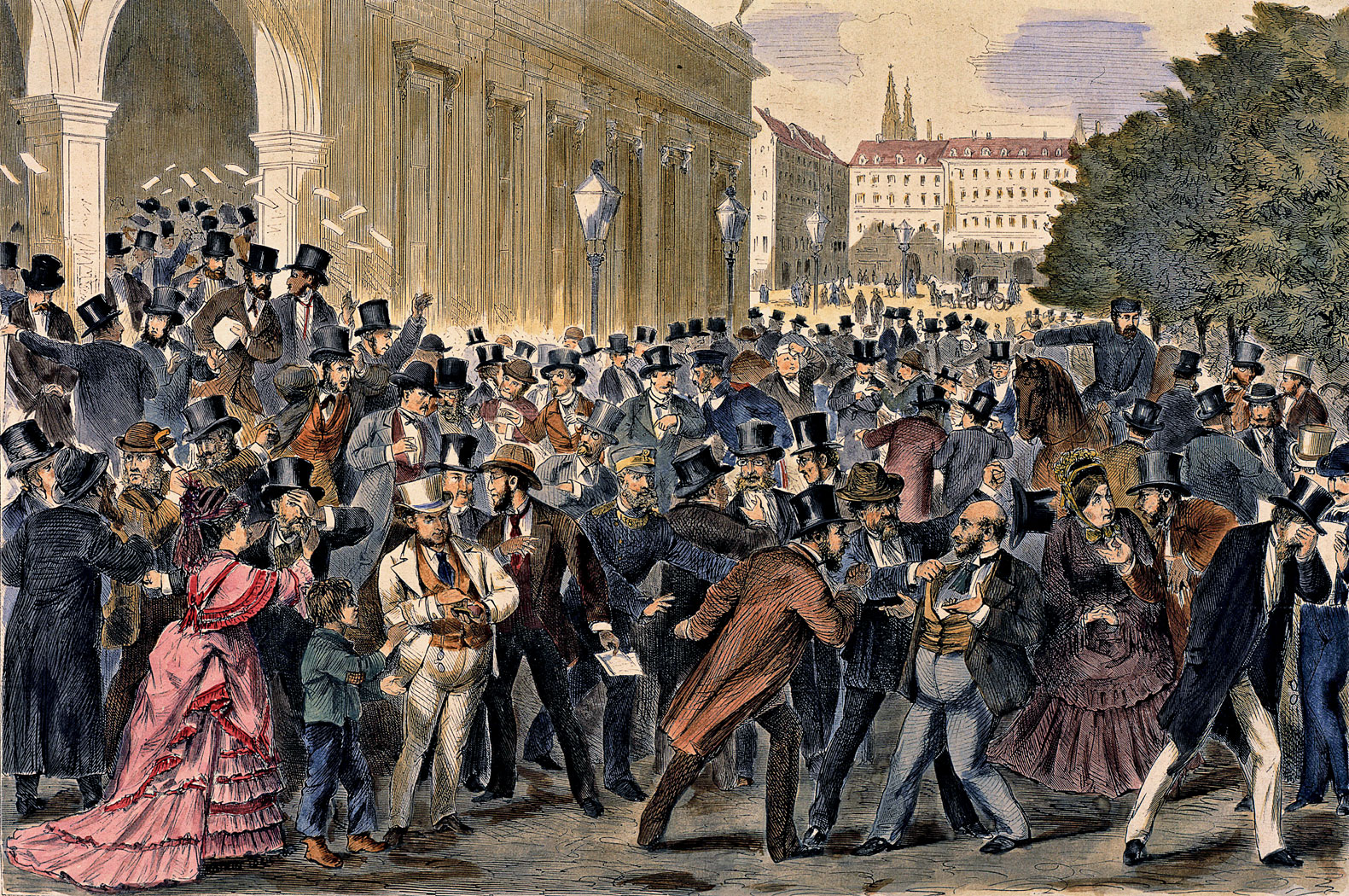
Black Friday, 9 May 1873, Vienna Stock Exchange. The Panic of 1873 and Long Depression followed.

The heavily rural Austro-Hungarian economy slowly modernised after 1867. Railroads opened up once-remote areas, and cities grew. Many small firms promoted capitalist way of production. Technological change accelerated industrialization and urbanization. The first Austrian stock exchange (the Wiener Börse) was opened in 1771 in Vienna, the first stock exchange of the Kingdom of Hungary (the Budapest Stock Exchange) was opened in Budapest in 1864. Several central banks or banks of issue were founded, including the Wiener Stadtbank then the Austrian National Bank in 1816. In 1878 after a decade of negotiations, the monarchy established the Austro-Hungarian Bank with principal offices in both Vienna and Budapest. The central bank was governed by alternating Austrian or Hungarian governors and vice-governors. Austria-Hungary also became the world's third-largest manufacturer and exporter of electric home appliances, electric industrial appliances, and power generation apparatus for power plants, after the United States and the German Empire, and it constructed Europe's second-largest railway network, after the German Empire. In 2000, a study estimated that GDP in constant national prices in 1913 was 19,140.8 million for Cisleithania and 10,971.6 million for Transleithania, a combined 30,112.4 million krone. (Note: Bosnia-Herzegovina is excluded from these estimates.) According to a 2005 study, GDP (PPP) in 1913 was 100,515 million 1990 Int$, the fifth-largest in Europe.

The gross national product per capita grew roughly 1.76% per year from 1870 to 1913. That level of growth compared very favorably to that of other European nations such as Britain (1%), France (1.06%), and Germany (1.51%). However, in a comparison with Germany and Britain, the Austro-Hungarian economy as a whole still lagged considerably, as sustained modernization had begun much later. Like the German Empire, that of Austria–Hungary frequently employed liberal economic policies and practices. In 1873, the old Hungarian capital Buda and Óbuda (Ancient Buda) were officially merged with the third city, Pest, thus creating the new metropolis of Budapest. The dynamic Pest grew into Hungary's administrative, political, economic, trade and cultural hub. Many of the state institutions and the modern administrative system of Hungary were established during this period. Economic growth centered on Vienna and Budapest, the Austrian lands (areas of modern Austria), the Alpine region and the Bohemian lands. In the later years of the 19th century, rapid economic growth spread to the central Hungarian plain and to the Carpathian lands. As a result, wide disparities of development existed within the empire. In general, the western areas became more developed than the eastern ones. The Kingdom of Hungary became the world's second-largest flour exporter after the United States. The large Hungarian food exports were not limited to neighbouring Germany and Italy: Hungary became the most important foreign food supplier of the large cities and industrial centres of the United Kingdom. Galicia, which has been described as the poorest province of Austro-Hungary, experienced near-constant famines, resulting in 50,000 deaths a year. The Istro-Romanians of Istria were also poor, as pastoralism lost strength and agriculture was not productive.

However, by the end of the 19th century, economic differences gradually began to even out as economic growth in the eastern parts of the monarchy consistently surpassed that in the western. The strong agriculture and food industry of the Kingdom of Hungary with the centre of Budapest became predominant within the empire and made up a large proportion of the export to the rest of Europe. Meanwhile, western areas, concentrated mainly around Prague and Vienna, excelled in various manufacturing industries. This division of labour between the east and west, besides the existing economic and monetary union, led to an even more rapid economic growth throughout Austria–Hungary by the early 20th century. However, since the turn of the twentieth century, the Austrian half of the Monarchy could preserve its dominance within the empire in the sectors of the Industrial Revolution, but Hungary had a better position in the modern industries of the Second Industrial Revolution, in these modern sectors of the second industrial revolution (like machine building industry and electric industry) the Austrian competition could not become dominant.

During the late 19th century, the Austrian half of the empire introduced a series of labour laws regulating industrial working conditions. During the ministry of Count Eduard Taaffe, factory inspectors were introduced to monitor compliance with labour regulations. A major reform enacted in 1885 prohibited industrial employment for children under the age of 14 and limited the working day of older minors to 11 hours.

== Infrastructure ==
=== Telecommunications ===
==== Telegraph ====
The first telegraph connection (Vienna—Brno—Prague) had started operation in 1847. In Hungarian territory the first telegraph stations were opened in Pressburg (Pozsony, today's Bratislava) in December 1847 and in Buda in 1848. The first telegraph connection between Vienna and Zagreb was constructed in 1850.

Austria subsequently joined a telegraph union with German states. In the Kingdom of Hungary, 2,406 telegraph post offices operated in 1884. By 1914 the number of telegraph offices reached 3,000 in post offices and further 2,400 were installed in the railway stations of the Kingdom of Hungary.

==== Telephone ====
The first telephone exchange was opened in Zagreb (8 January 1881), the second was in Budapest (1 May 1881), and the third was opened in Vienna (3 June 1881). Initially telephony was available in the homes of individual subscribers, companies and offices. Public telephone stations appeared in the 1890s, and they quickly became widespread in post offices and railway stations. Austria–Hungary had 568 million telephone calls in 1913; only two Western European countries had more phone calls: the German Empire and the United Kingdom. The Austro-Hungarian Empire was followed by France with 396 million telephone calls and Italy with 230 million phone calls. In 1916, there were 366 million telephone calls in Cisleithania, among them 8.4 million long distant calls. By 1914, more than 2000 settlements had telephone exchange in Kingdom of Hungary.

==== Electronic audio broadcasting ====
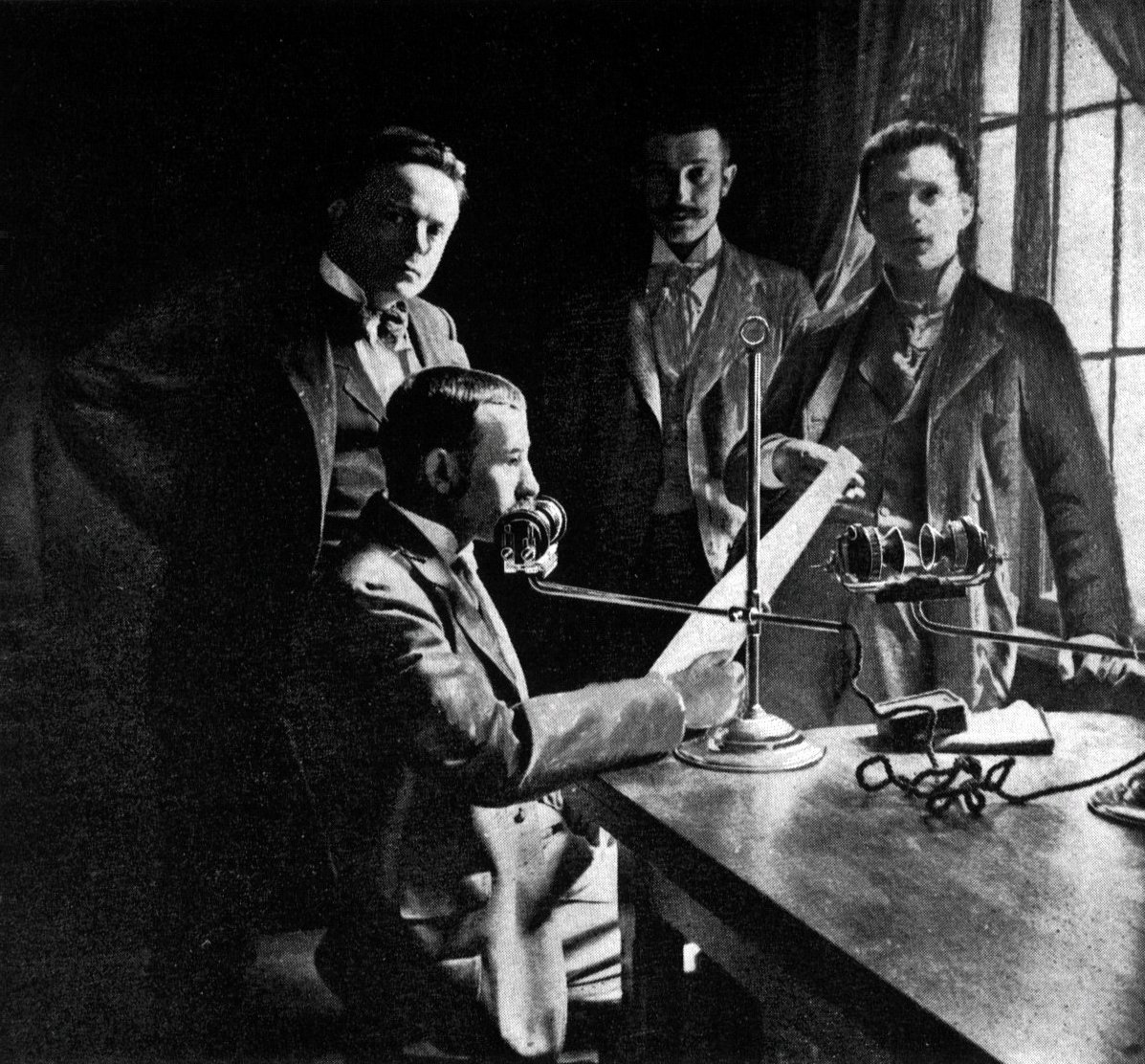
A stentor reading the day's news in the Telefonhírmondó of Budapest

The Telefon Hírmondó (Telephone Herald) news and entertainment service was introduced in Budapest in 1893. Two decades before the introduction of radio broadcasting, people could listen to political, economic and sports news, cabaret, music and opera in Budapest daily. It operated over a special type of telephone exchange system.

=== Rail transport ===
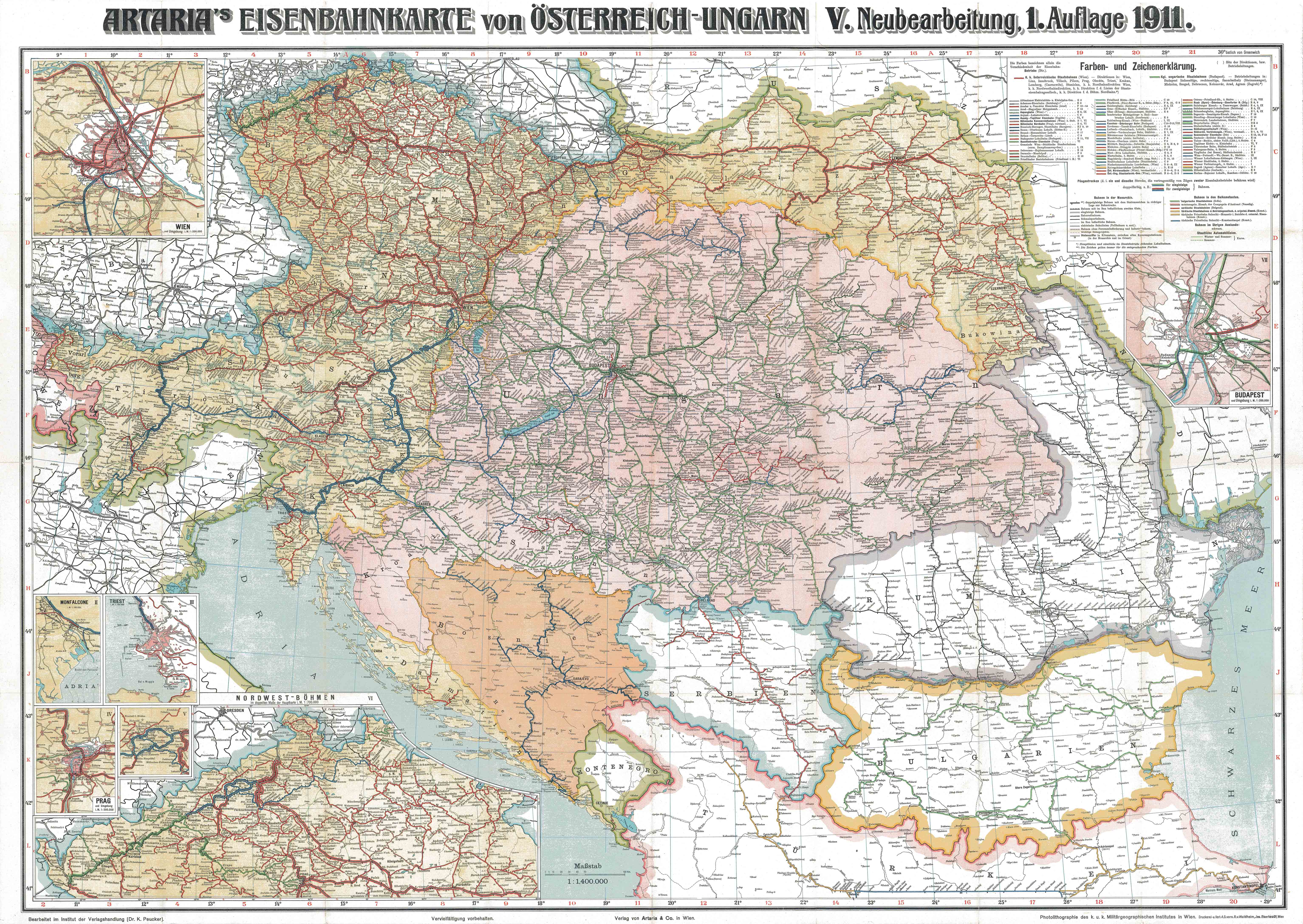
Detailed railway map of Austrian and Hungarian railways from 1911

By 1913, the combined length of the railway tracks of the Austrian Empire and Kingdom of Hungary reached 43,280 kilometres (26,890 miles). In Western Europe only Germany had more extended railway network (63,378 km, 39,381 mi); the Austro-Hungarian Empire was followed by France (40,770 km, 25,330 mi), the United Kingdom (32,623 km, 20,271 mi), Italy (18,873 km, 11,727 mi) and Spain (15,088 km, 9,375 mi).

==== Railways in Transleithania ====
The first Hungarian steam locomotive railway line was opened on 15 July 1846 between Pest and Vác. In 1890 most large Hungarian private railway companies were nationalized as a consequence of the poor management of private companies, except the strong Austrian-owned Kaschau-Oderberg Railway (KsOd) and the Austrian-Hungarian Southern Railway (SB/DV). They also joined the zone tariff system of the MÁV (Hungarian State Railways). By 1910, the total length of the rail networks of Hungarian Kingdom reached 22,869 kilometres (14,210 miles), the Hungarian network linked more than 1,490 settlements. Nearly half (52%) of the empire's railways were built in Hungary, thus the railroad density there became higher than that of Cisleithania. This has ranked Hungarian railways the 6th most dense in the world (ahead of Germany and France).

Electrified commuter railways: A set of four electric commuter rai lines were built in Budapest, the BHÉV: Ráckeve line (1887), Szentendre line (1888), Gödöllő line (1888), Csepel line (1912)

==== Tramway lines in the cities ====
Horse-drawn tramways appeared in the first half of the 19th century. Between the 1850s and 1880s many were built : Vienna (1865), Budapest (1866), Brno (1869), Trieste (1876). Steam trams appeared in the late 1860s. The electrification of tramways started in the late 1880s. The first electrified tramway in Austria–Hungary was built in Budapest in 1887.

Electric tramway lines in the Austrian Empire:

- Austria: Gmunden (1894); Linz, Vienna (1897); Graz (1898); Trieste (1900); Ljubljana (1901); Innsbruck (1905); Unterlach, Ybbs an der Donau (1907); Salzburg (1909); Klagenfurt, Sankt Pölten (1911); Piran (1912)
- Austrian Littoral: Pula (1904).
- Bohemia: Prague (1891); Teplice (1895); Liberec (1897); Ústí nad Labem, Plzeň, Olomouc (1899); Moravia, Brno, Jablonec nad Nisou (1900); Ostrava (1901); Mariánské Lázně (1902); Budějovice, České Budějovice, Jihlava (1909)
- Austrian Silesia: Opava (Troppau) (1905), Cieszyn (Cieszyn) (1911)
- Dalmatia: Dubrovnik (1910)
- Galicia: Lviv (1894), Bielsko-Biała (1895); Kraków (1901); Tarnów, Cieszyn (1911)

Electric tramway lines in the Kingdom of Hungary:

- Hungary: Budapest (1887); Pressburg/Pozsony/Bratislava (1895); Szabadka/Subotica (1897), Szombathely (1897), Miskolc (1897); Temesvár/Timișoara (1899); Sopron (1900); Szatmárnémeti/Satu Mare (1900); Nyíregyháza (1905); Nagyszeben/Sibiu (1905); Nagyvárad/Oradea (1906); Szeged (1908); Debrecen (1911); Újvidék/Novi Sad (1911); Kassa/Košice (1913); Pécs (1913)
- Croatia: Fiume (1899); Pola (1904); Opatija – Lovran (1908); Zagreb (1910); Dubrovnik (1910).

==== Underground ====
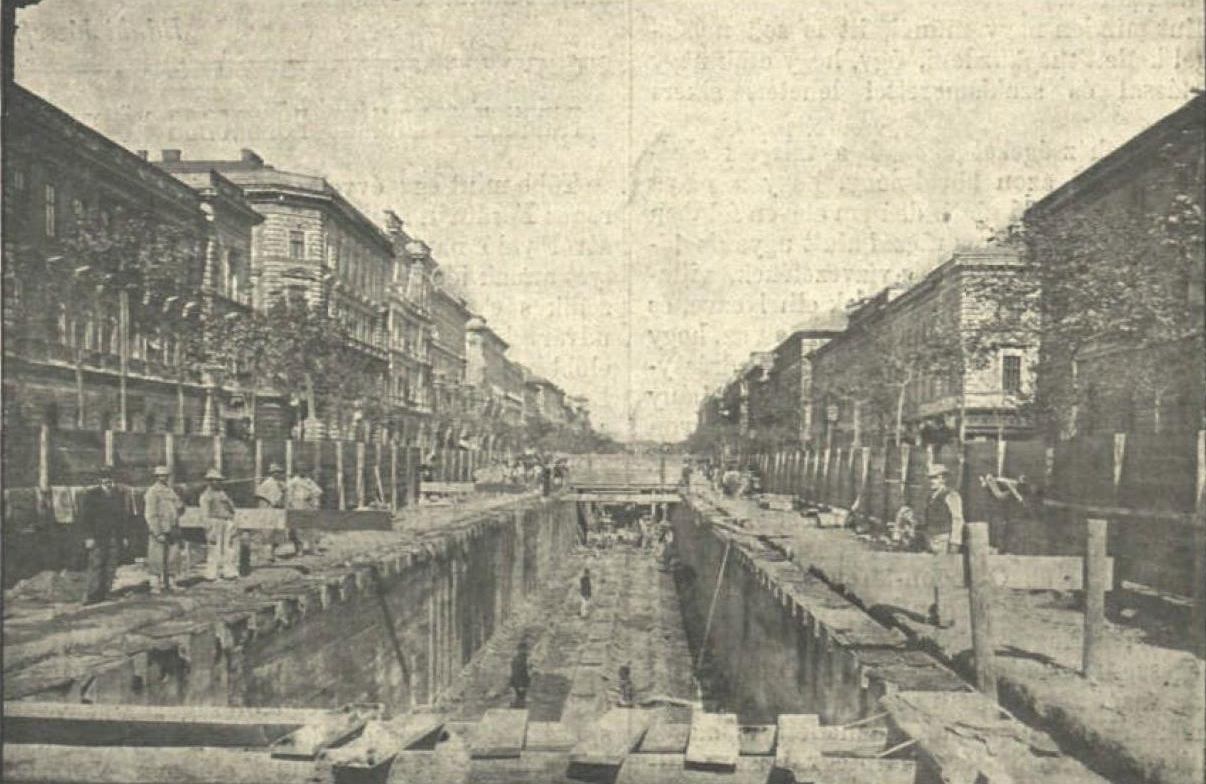
The start of construction of the underground in Budapest (1894–1896)

The Budapest Metro Line 1 (originally the "Franz Joseph Underground Electric Railway Company") is the second oldest underground railway in the world (the first being the London Underground's Metropolitan Line and the third being Glasgow), and the first on the European mainland. It was built from 1894 to 1896 and opened on 2 May 1896. In 2002, it was listed as a UNESCO World Heritage Site. The M1 line became an IEEE Milestone due to the radically new innovations in its era: "Among the railway's innovative elements were bidirectional tram cars; electric lighting in the subway stations and tram cars; and an overhead wire structure instead of a third-rail system for power".

=== Inland waterways and river regulation ===
The first Danubian steamer company, Donaudampfschiffahrtsgesellschaft (DDSG), was the world's largest inland shipping company until the collapse of Austria-Hungary.

In 1900 the engineer C. Wagenführer drew up plans to link the Danube and the Adriatic Sea by a canal from Vienna to Trieste. It was born from the desire of Austria–Hungary to have a direct link to the Adriatic Sea but was never constructed.

==== Lower Danube and the Iron Gates ====
In 1831 a plan had already been drafted to make the passage navigable, at the initiative of the Hungarian politician István Széchenyi. Finally Gábor Baross, Hungary's "Iron Minister", succeeded in financing this project. The riverbed rocks and the associated rapids made the gorge valley an infamous passage for shipping. In German, the passage is still known as the Kataraktenstrecke, even though the cataracts are gone. Near the actual "Iron Gates" strait the Prigrada rock was the most important obstacle until 1896: the river widened considerably here and the water level was consequently low. Upstream, the Greben rock near the "Kazan" gorge was notorious.

==== Tisza River ====
The length of the Tisza river in Hungary used to be 1,419 kilometres (882 miles). It flowed through the Great Hungarian Plain, which is one of the largest flat areas in central Europe. Since plains can cause a river to flow very slowly, the Tisza used to follow a path with many curves and turns, which led to many large floods in the area.

After several small-scale attempts, István Széchenyi organised the "regulation of the Tisza" (Hungarian: a Tisza szabályozása) which started on 27 August 1846, and substantially ended in 1880. The new length of the river in Hungary was 966 km (600 mi) (1,358 km (844 mi) total), with 589 km (366 mi) of "dead channels" and 136 km (85 mi) of new riverbed. The resultant length of the flood-protected river comprises 2,940 km (1,830 mi) (out of 4,220 km (2,620 mi) of all Hungarian protected rivers).

=== Shipping and ports ===
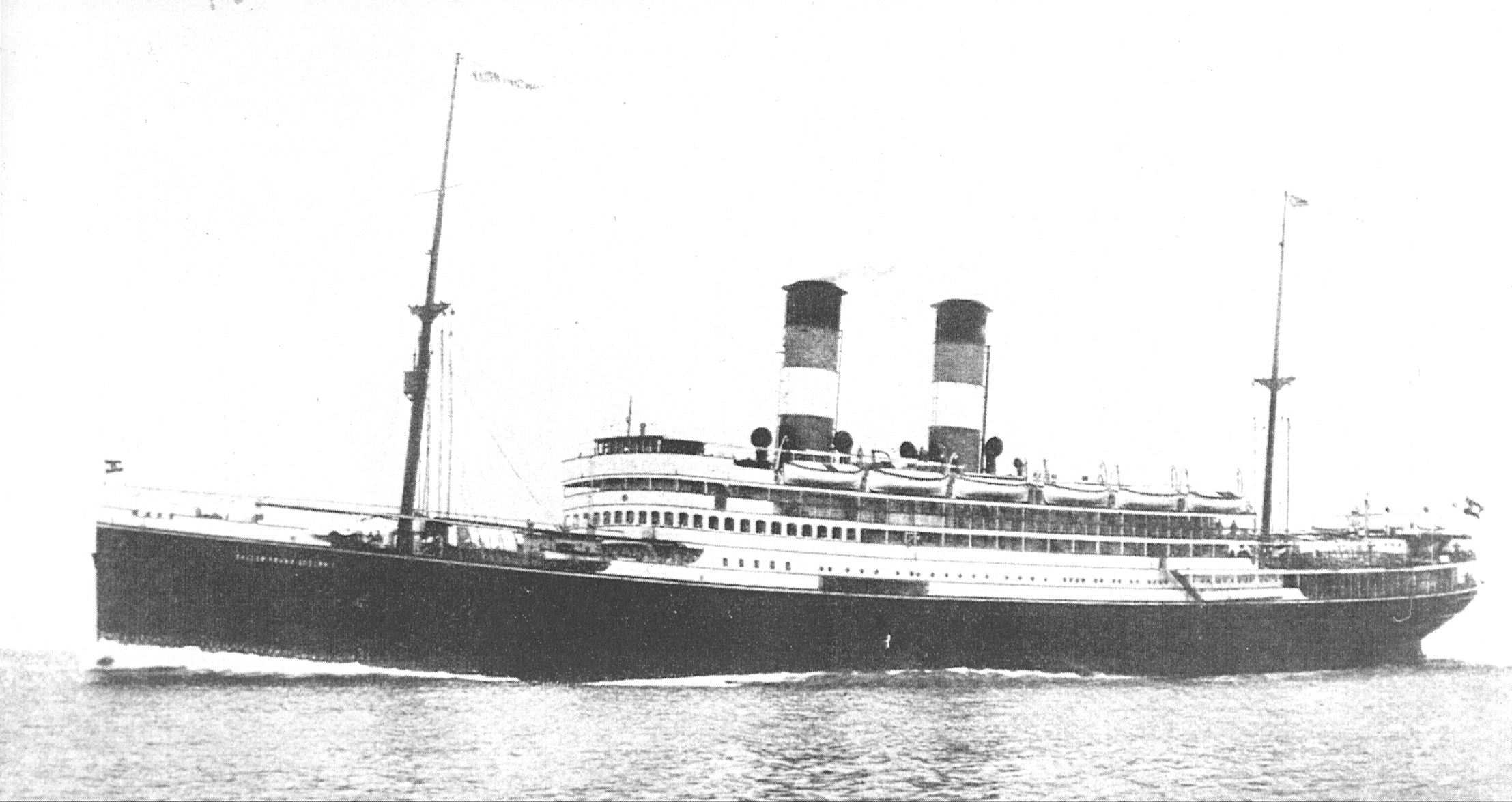
The SS Kaiser Franz Joseph I (12,567 GRT) of the Austro-Americana company was the largest passenger ship ever built in Austria. Because of its control over the coast of much of the Balkans, Austria–Hungary had access to several seaports.

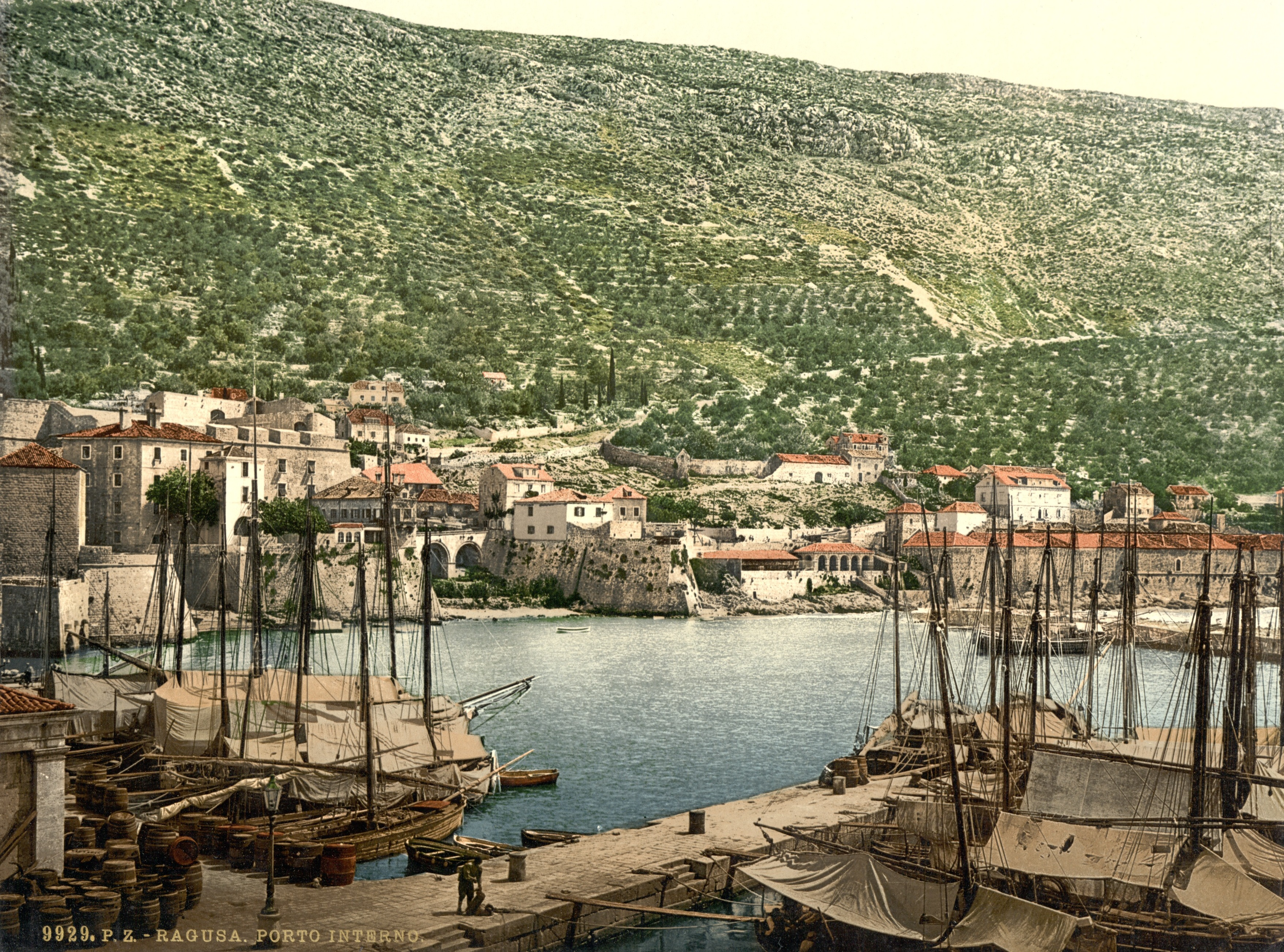
Dubrovnik, Kingdom of Dalmatia

The most important seaport was Trieste (today part of Italy), where the Austrian merchant marine was based. Two major shipping companies (Austrian Lloyd and Austro-Americana) and several shipyards were located there. From 1815 to 1866, Venice had been part of the Habsburg empire. The loss of Venice prompted the development of the Austrian merchant marine. By 1913, the commercial marine of Austria, comprised 16,764 vessels with a tonnage of 471,252, and crews numbering 45,567. Of the total in 1913, 394 were steamers (tonnage 422,368), and 16,370 were sailing vessels (tonnage 48,884) The Austrian Lloyd was one of the biggest ocean shipping companies of the time. Prior to the beginning of World War I, the company owned 65 middle-sized and large steamers. The Austro-Americana owned one third of this number, including the biggest Austrian passenger ship, the SS Kaiser Franz Joseph I. In comparison to the Austrian Lloyd, the Austro-American concentrated on destinations in North and South America. The Austro-Hungarian Navy became much more significant than previously, as industrialization provided sufficient revenues to develop it. Pola (Pula, today part of Croatia) was especially significant for the navy.

The most important seaport for the Hungarian part of the monarchy was Fiume (Rijeka, today part of Croatia), where the Hungarian shipping companies, such as the Adria, operated. The commercial marine of the Kingdom of Hungary in 1913 comprised 545 vessels of a tonnage of 144,433, and crews numbering 3,217. Of the total number of vessels, 134 were steamers (tonnage 142,539), and 411 were sailing vessels (tonnage 1,894).

== Military ==
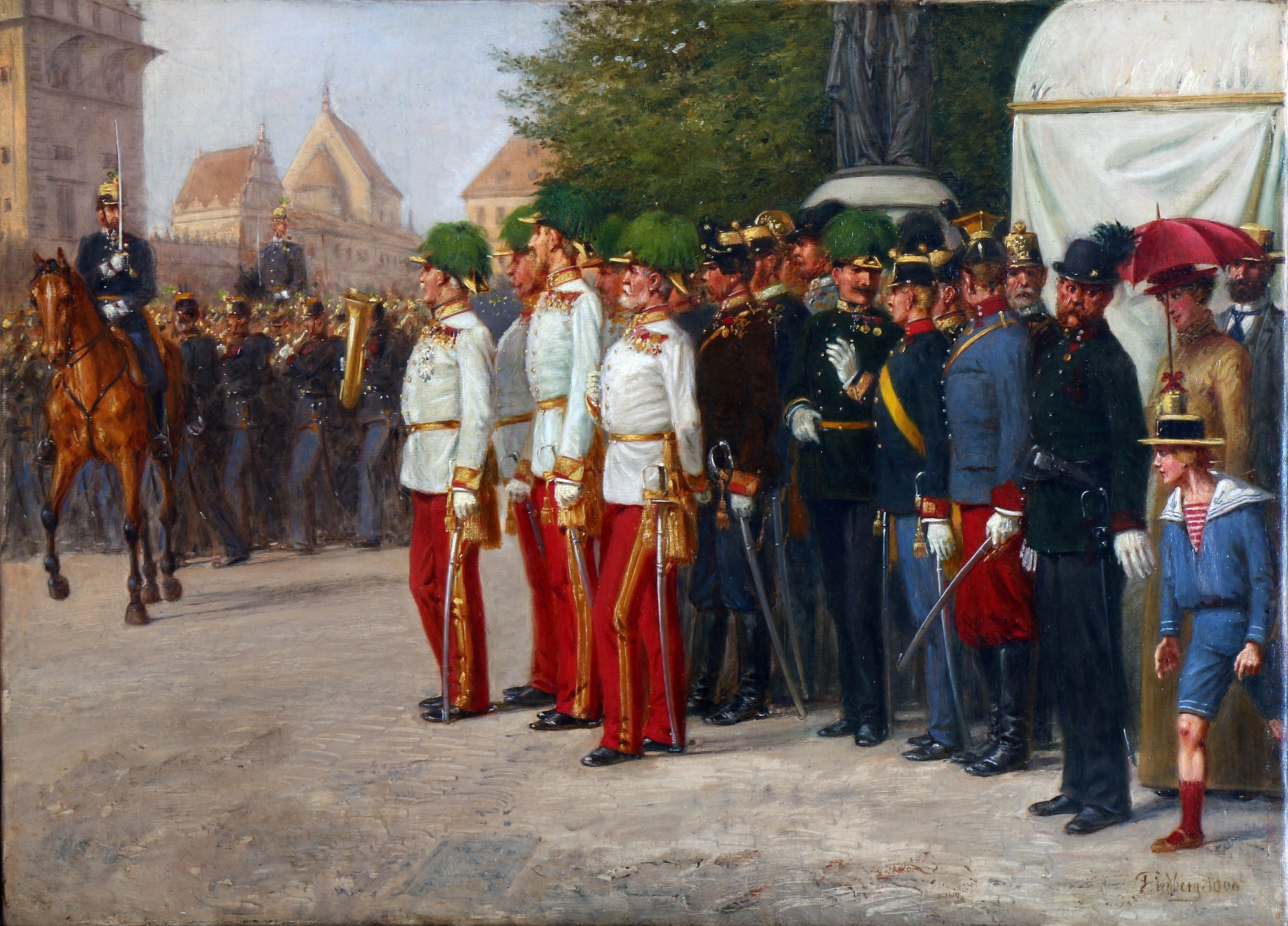
Military parade in Prague, Kingdom of Bohemia, 1900

The Austro-Hungarian Army was under the command of Archduke Albrecht, Duke of Teschen (1817–1895), an old-fashioned bureaucrat who opposed modernization. The military system of the Austro-Hungarian monarchy was similar in both states, and rested since 1868 upon the principle of the universal and personal obligation of the citizen to bear arms. Its military force was composed of the Common Army; the special armies, namely the Austrian Landwehr, and the Hungarian Honvéd, which were separate national institutions, and the Landsturm or levy-en masse. As stated above, the common army stood under the administration of the joint minister of war, while the special armies were under the administration of the respective ministries of national defence. The yearly contingent of recruits for the army was fixed by the military bills voted on by the Austrian and Hungarian parliaments and was generally determined on the basis of the population, according to the last census returns. It amounted in 1905 to 103,100 men, of which Austria furnished 59,211 men, and Hungary 43,889. Besides 10,000 men were annually allotted to the Austrian Landwehr, and 12,500 to the Hungarian Honved. The term of service was two years (three years in the cavalry) with the colours, seven or eight in the reserve and two in the Landwehr; in the case of men not drafted to the active army the same total period of service was spent in various special reserves.

The common minister of war was the head for the administration of all military affairs, except those of the Austrian Landwehr and of the Hungarian Honved, which were committed to the ministries for national defence of the two respective states. But the supreme command of the army was nominally vested in the monarch, who had the power to take all measures regarding the whole army. In practice, the emperor's nephew Archduke Albrecht was his chief military advisor and made the policy decisions.

The Austro-Hungarian Navy was mainly a coast defence force, and also included a flotilla of monitors for the Danube. It was administered by the naval department of the ministry of war.

== Successor states ==
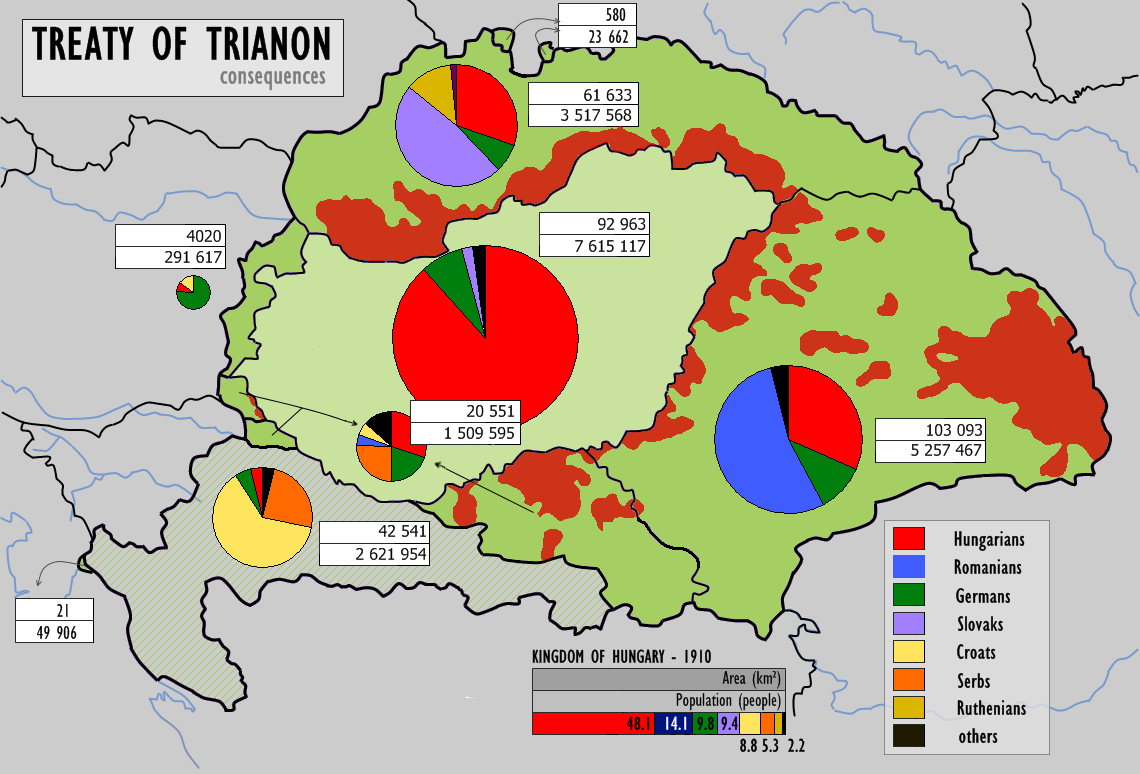
The Treaty of Trianon: Kingdom of Hungary lost 72% of its land and 3.3 million people of Hungarian ethnicity.

There were two legal successor states of the former Austro–Hungarian monarchy:

- German Austria (which became the Republic of Austria)
- Hungarian Democratic Republic (which after a few other short-lived intermediaries became the Kingdom of Hungary)

The 1919 Treaties of Saint-Germain-en-Laye (between the victors of World War I and Austria) and Trianon (between the victors and Hungary) regulated the new borders of Austria and Hungary, reducing them to small-sized and landlocked states. The Entente not only assumed without question that the minority peoples wished to leave Austria and Hungary, but allowed them to claim vast territories containing sizeable German- and Hungarian-speaking populations. With this in mind, in regard to areas without a decisive national majority, the Entente powers ruled in many cases in favour of the newly emancipated independent nation-states. The Republic of Austria lost roughly 60% of the old Austrian Empire's territory. It also had to drop its plans for union with Germany, as it was not allowed to unite with Germany without League approval. Hungary, however, was severely disrupted by the loss of 72% of its territory, 64% of its population and most of its natural resources. The Hungarian Democratic Republic was short-lived and was temporarily replaced by the communist Hungarian Soviet Republic. Romanian troops ousted Béla Kun and his communist government during the Hungarian–Romanian War of 1919.

In the summer of 1919, a Habsburg, Archduke Joseph August, became regent, but was forced to stand down after only two weeks when it became apparent the Allies would not recognise him. Finally, in March 1920, royal powers were entrusted to a regent, Miklós Horthy, who had been the last commanding admiral of the Austro-Hungarian Navy and had helped organize the counter-revolutionary forces. It was this government that signed the Treaty of Trianon under protest on 4 June 1920 at the Grand Trianon Palace in Versailles, France. The restored Kingdom of Hungary lost roughly 72% of the pre-war territory of the Kingdom of Hungary.

=== Habsburg banishment ===
Austria had passed the "Habsburg Law", which both dethroned the Habsburgs and banished all Habsburgs from Austrian territory. While Karl was banned from ever returning to Austria again, other Habsburgs could return if they gave up all claims to the defunct throne. In March and again in October 1921, ill-prepared attempts by Karl to regain the throne in Budapest collapsed. The initially wavering Horthy, after receiving threats of intervention from the Allied Powers and the Little Entente, refused his cooperation. Soon afterward, the Hungarian government nullified the Pragmatic Sanction, effectively dethroning the Habsburgs. Subsequently, the British took custody of Karl and removed him and his family to the Portuguese island of Madeira, where he died the following year.

=== Territorial legacy after World War I ===
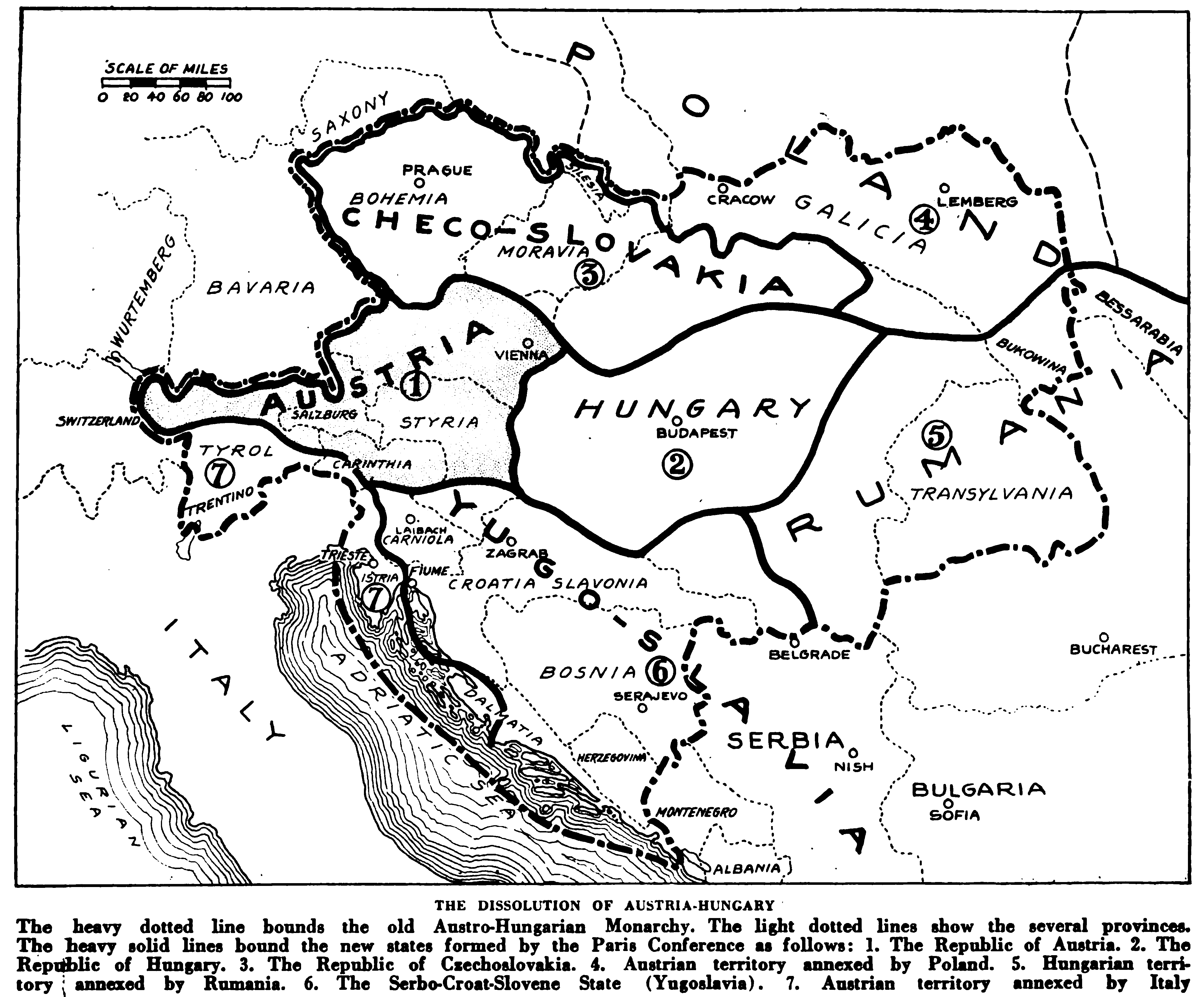
New hand-drawn borders of Austria–Hungary in the Treaty of Trianon and Saint Germain (1919–1920)

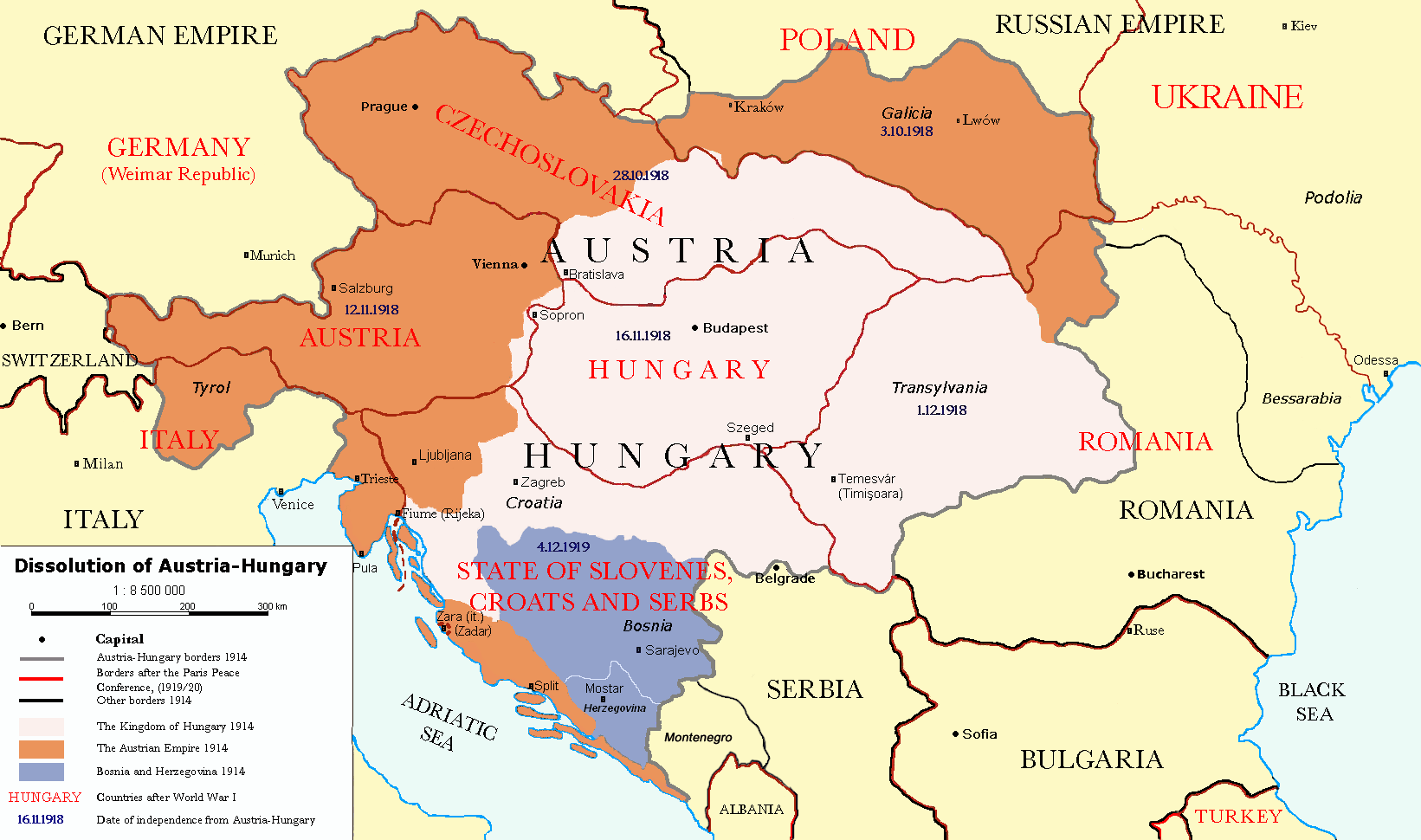
New borders of Austria–Hungary after the Treaty of Trianon and Saint Germain Border of Austria–Hungary in 1914 Borders in 1914 Borders in 1920 Empire of Austria in 1914 Kingdom of Hungary in 1914 Bosnia and Herzegovina in 1914

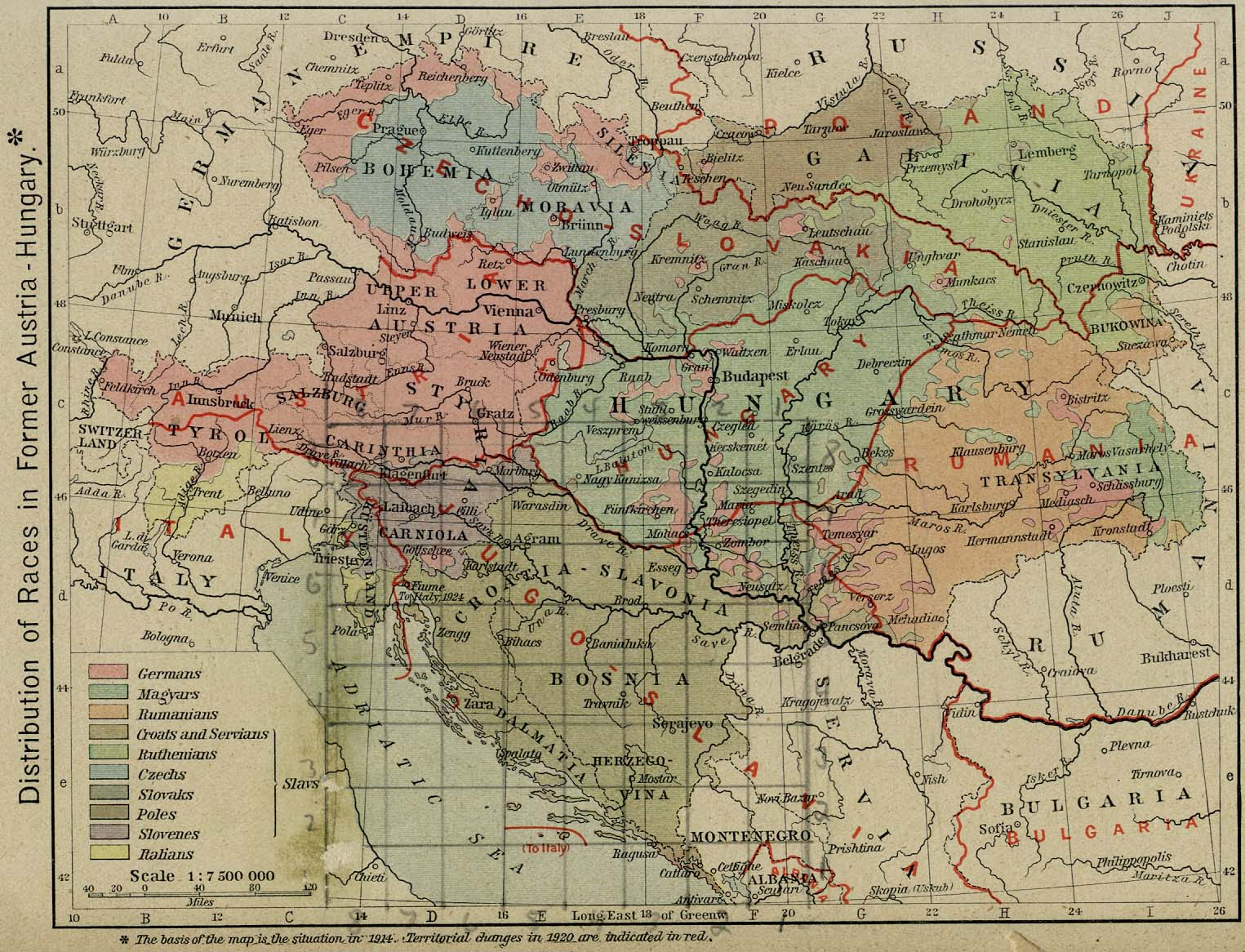
Post-WWI borders on an ethnic map

The following states were formed, re-established or expanded at the dissolution of the former Austro–Hungarian monarchy:

- German Austria (which became the Republic of Austria)
- First Hungarian Republic which became the Hungarian Soviet Republic, subsequently briefly restored and replaced by the Hungarian Republic, ultimately transformed into the Kingdom of Hungary
- First Czechoslovak Republic, later "Czechoslovakia"
- Second Polish Republic, contested by the short-lived proto-states of Tarnobrzeg Republic and Polish Soviet Socialist Republic
- State of Slovenes, Croats and Serbs and the Kingdom of Serbia, both later absorbed into the Kingdom of Serbs, Croats and Slovenes
- Greater Romania
- Kingdom of Italy
- Republic of China (former Austro-Hungarian concession of Tianjin)
- the short-lived Ruthenian (Ukrainian and Rusyn) proto-states of West Ukrainian People's Republic (later absorbed into Ukrainian People's Republic), Hutsul Republic, Lemko Republic, Komancza Republic and the Galician Soviet Socialist Republic; all were ultimately absorbed mostly into Poland, but also into Hungary, Czechoslovakia, Romania and Yugoslavia.

The Principality of Liechtenstein, which had formerly looked to Vienna for protection and whose ruling house held sizable real estate in Cisleithania, formed a customs and defense union with Switzerland, and adopted the Swiss currency instead of the Austrian. In April 1919, Vorarlberg—the westernmost province of Austria—voted by a large majority to join Switzerland; however, both the Swiss and the Allies disregarded this result.

== See also ==
- Aftermath of World War I – Events after the end of the war in 1918
- Austrian nobility – Status group
- Austro-Hungarian entry into World War I
- Corporative federalism – A form of administration adopted by the Austro-Hungarian Empire
- Diplomatic history of World War I
- Ethnic composition of Austria–Hungary
- Former countries in Europe after 1815
- Hungarian nobility – Privileged social class in the Kingdom of Hungary
- Lands of the Bohemian Crown (1867–1918) – History of the Czech lands (Bohemia and Moravia)
- United States of Greater Austria – Proposed federal state in Central Europe
