= List of people from Trieste =

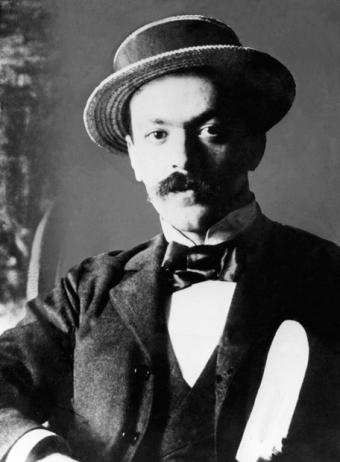
Italo Svevo

The Province of Trieste is a province in the autonomous Friuli-Venezia Giulia region of Italy. The following is a list of notable Triestini (Triestines) and some outsiders who either wrote about the city or resided there.

== Literature ==
Many famous authors were born and/or lived many years in Trieste. They include:

=== Italian-language authors ===
- Roberto Bazlen (1902–1965), writer.
- Enzo Bettiza (1927–2017), writer and journalist, born in Split.
- Nicoletta Costa (born 1953), children's book writer and illustrator.
- Claudio Magris (born 1939), writer and essayist.
- Biagio Marin (1891–1985), poet (born in Grado).
- Giorgio Pressburger (1937–2017), author and director.
- Umberto Saba (1883–1957), poet.
- Francesco Saba Sardi (1922–2012), author, essayist and translator.
- Scipio Slataper (1888–1915), essayist.
- Giani Stuparich (1891–1961), writer and essayist.
- Italo Svevo (1861–1928), novelist.
- Susanna Tamaro (born 1957), novelist.
- Fulvio Tomizza (1935–1999), writer, born in Istria (now in Croatia).

Vladimir Bartol

=== Slovene-language authors ===
- Marija Mijot (1902–1994), seamstress, dialectal poet and playwright
- Vladimir Bartol (1903–1967), writer.
- Igo Gruden (1893–1948), poet.
- Dušan Jelinčič (born 1953), writer, essayist, and mountain climber.
- Marica Nadlišek Bartol (1867–1940), writer and editor.
- Boris Pahor (1913–2022), novelist.
- Alojz Rebula (1924–2018), writer and essayist.

=== German-language authors ===
- Theodor Däubler (1876–1934), writer and poet.
- Robert Hamerling (1830–1889), writer.
- Ricarda Huch (1864–1947), writer.
- Julius Kugy (1858–1944), writer and essayist (born in Gorizia).
- Rainer Maria Rilke (1875–1926), wrote Duino Elegies during his stay in Duino.

=== Authors in other languages ===
- Isabel Burton (1831–1896), English writer, explorer and adventurer.
- Richard Francis Burton (1821–1890), British explorer, writer, orientalist scholar, and soldier.
- James Joyce (1882–1941), Irish novelist, poet, and literary critic.
- D. H. Lawrence (1885–1930), English novelist, short story writer, poet and essayist.
- Charles Lever (1806–1872), Irish novelist and raconteur, whose novels, according to Anthony Trollope, were just like his conversation.
- Jan Morris (1926–2020), Welsh historian, author and travel writer.
- Stendhal (1783–1842), French author and essayist; served as Consul of France in Trieste.
- Alexander Wheelock Thayer (1817–1897), American librarian and journalist.
- Samuel David Luzzatto (1800–1865), Italian Jewish scholar, poet, and a member of the Wissenschaft des Judentums movement.

== Architects, inventors, gallerists, designers, and visual artists ==
- Emilio Ambrosini (1850–1912), architect.
- Milko Bambič (1905–1991), illustrator and cartoonist.
- Franca Batich (born 1940), Italian painter.
- Leo Castelli (1907–1999), pioneering gallerist and contemporary art dealer.
- Avgust Černigoj (1898–1985), painter.
- Bruno Chersicla (1937–2013), painter and sculptor.
- Tullio Crali (1910–2000), futurist painter.
- Marcello Dudovich (1878–1962), illustrator.
- Leonor Fini (1907–1996), artist.
- Giuseppe Lorenzo Gatteri (1829–1884), Italian painter.
- Isidoro Grünhut (1862–1896), artist.
- Alexander Kircher (1867–1939), painter.
- Franko Luin (1941–2005), Swedish-Slovene graphic designer.
- Argio Orell (1884–1942), painter.
- Boris Podrecca (born 1940), architect.
- Alessandra Querzola (born 1977), Oscar nominated set designer.
- Stanislav Rapotec (1913–1997), painter.
- Ruggero Rovan (1877–1965), sculptor.
- Felice Schiavoni (1803–1881), artist.
- Ernesto Nathan Rogers (1909–1969), architect.
- Eugenio Scomparini (1845–1913), painter.
- Vito Timmel (1886–1949), painter.
- Jožef Tominc (1790–1866), Biedermeier painter.
- Antonio Valdoni (1834–1890), painter.
- Umberto Veruda (1868–1904), painter.
- Carlo Wostry (1865–1943), painter.
- Marion Wulz (1905–1993), photographer.
- Wanda Wulz (1903–1984), photographer.

== Actors, models, musicians, influencers, and performance artists ==
- Federico Agostini (born 1959), violinist.
- Alda Balestra (born 1954), fashion and beauty model.
- Antonio Bibalo (1922–2008), pianist and composer.
- Fedora Barbieri (1920–2003), Italian Mezzo-Soprano/Contralto opera singer.
- Piero Cappuccilli (1926–2005), operatic baritone.
- Antonio d'Antoni (1801–1859), opera composer and conductor.
- Raffaello de Banfield (1922–2008), British composer.
- George Dolenz (1908–1963), actor; father of Micky Dolenz of the Monkees.
- Licia Fertz (1930-), social media influencer and activist.
- Hans Herbert Fiedler (1907–2004), opera stage actor.
- Fulvia Franco (1931–1988), Italian actress, model and beauty pageant titleholder.
- Paul Henreid (1908–1992), actor.
- Alfred Jaëll (1832–1882), Austrian pianist.
- Tullio Kezich (1928–2009), actor, playwright, and screenwriter.
- Anita Kravos (born 1974), Italian actress.
- Paola Loew (1934–1999), actress.
- Paolo Longo (born 1967), composer and conductor.
- Alessandro Lotta (born 1975), former bassist of the bands Rhapsody of Fire and Wingdom.
- Lelio Luttazzi (1923–2010), musician, composer, showman and presenter.
- Mauro Maur (born 1958), trumpet player and composer.
- Alexander Moissi (1879–1935), Austrian stage actor of Albanian descent.
- Ave Ninchi (1914–1997), actress.
- Denis Novato (born 1976), Slovene musician.
- Loredana Nusciak (1942–2006), actress and model.
- Alberto Randegger (1832–1911), composer.
- Rodolfo Ranni (born 1937), Italian Argentine film actor.
- Ivan Rassimov (1938–2003), Italian actor of Serbian descent.
- Rada Rassimov (born 1941), Italian actress of Serbian descent.
- Enrico Rava (born 1939), jazz trumpeter.
- Teddy Reno (born 1926), singer and producer.
- Carlo Rizzo (1907–1979), stage and film actor.
- Victor de Sabata (1892–1967), conductor.
- Laura Solari (1913–1984), film actress.
- Alex Staropoli (born 1970), keyboardist of the band Rhapsody of Fire.
- Giorgio Strehler (1921–1997), opera and theater director.
- Elisa Toffoli (born 1977), singer-songwriter, pianist, and guitarist.
- Luca Turilli (born 1972), guitarist of the band Rhapsody of Fire.

== Television personalities ==
- Lidia Bastianich (born 1947), Italian-American chef and television cooking show host whose family lived in a refugee camp in Trieste after their escape from Istria, Yugoslavia (now Croatia).
- Bianca Maria Piccinino (1924–2025), journalist RAI, the first woman to read a news broadcasting.

== Entrepreneurs and business leaders ==
- Andrea Illy (born 1964), entrepreneur.
- Ernesto Illy (1925–2008), entrepreneur, founder of coffee empire.
- Francesco Illy (1892–1956), entrepreneur, inventor of coffee machinery.
- Lionello Stock (1866–1948), entrepreneur of liqueurs and beverages, founder of Stock S.p.A. (known for the Keglevich brand).
- Mihajlo Vučetić (1790–1882), grain merchant, shipowner and shareholder in Austrian Lloyd.

== Fashion designers ==
- Renato Balestra (1924–2022), fashion designer.
- Adriano Goldschmied (born 1944), leading international denim designer; founder of Diesel and Replay jeans.
- Ottavio Missoni (1921–2013), fashion designer.
- Mila Schön (1916–2008), fashion designer.

== Journalists and authors ==
- Sergio Amidei (1904–1981), screenwriter.
- Giovanna Botteri (born 1957), journalist.
- Almerigo Grilz (1953–1987), journalist, freelance war reporter and politician. Was killed during an African reportage.
- Leo Negrelli (born in Trieste, died in Spain in 1974), journalist.
- Ann Shulgin (1931–2022), author.
- Demetrio Volcic (1931–2021), journalist and politician.

== Political figures ==
- Engelbert Besednjak (1894–1968), Slovene politician.
- Don Beyer (born 1950), U.S. representative for Virginia and U.S. ambassador to Switzerland and Liechtenstein
- Willer Bordon (1949–2015), Italian politician, Minister of the Environment, 2000–2001.
- Gualtiero Driussi (1920–1996), Italian politician
- Josip Ferfolja (1880–1958), Slovenian social-democratic politician and human rights activist.
- Odilo Globočnik (1904–1945), Nazi war criminal, SS leader.
- Riccardo Illy (born 1955), Italian politician.
- Ezio Mizzan (1905–1969), Italian diplomat, the second Italian Ambassador to Thailand (1959–1965) and the ninth Italian Ambassador to Pakistan (1966–1969).
- Ilda Mizzan (1885–1922), Italian irredentist and painter, wife of Francesco Salata.
- Stefano Patuanelli (born 1974), Italian politician, minister of economic development.
- Mitja Ribičič (1919–2013), Slovenian Communist leader, Prime Minister of Yugoslavia (1969–1971).
- Vittorio Vidali (aka Enea Sormenti, Jacobo Hurwitz Zender, Carlos Contreras) (1900–1983), Communist agent.
- Josip Wilfan (1878–1955), Slovene jurist, politician, and human rights activist.

== Religious figures ==
- Pietro Bonomo (1458–1546), humanist and bishop, supporter of the Protestant Reformation.
- Moisè Tedeschi (1821–1898), rabbi and Bible commentator.

== Educators ==
- Draga Gregorič Rosenberg (1879–1965), a Slovenian preschool teacher and preschool principal, founder of first preschool in the Servola district of Trieste

== Humanitarian workers ==
- Ivana Zorman (1836–1922), Slovenian headmistress of an orphanage and a humanitarian worker

== Scholars, scientists, and intellectuals ==
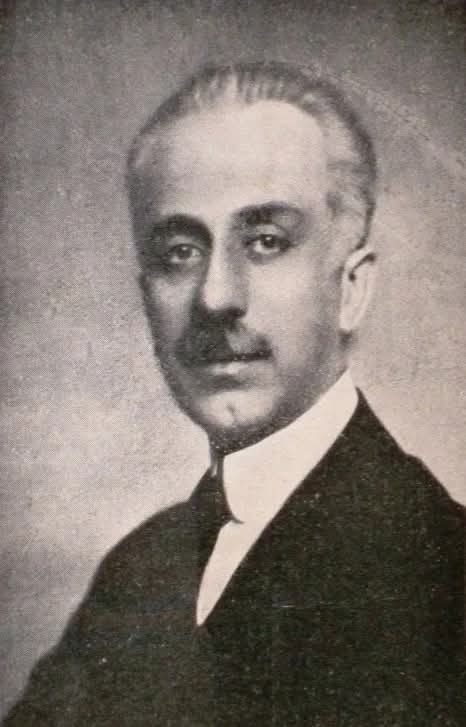
Francesco Salata

- Luisa Accati (born 1942), historian and feminist theoretician.
- Florian Biesik (1849–1926), Silesian linguist, Wymysorys language scholar and poet.
- Ludwig Boltzmann (1844–1906), Austrian physicist.
- Paolo Budinich (1916–2013), physicist.
- Sir Richard Burton (1821–1890), British explorer, geographer, writer, orientalist, cartographer, linguist, poet, fencer, and diplomat; discovered Lake Tanganyika.
- Lavo Čermelj (1889–1980), Slovene physicist and public intellectual.
- Giacomo Ciamician (1857–1922), chemist.
- Laura Dallapiccola (1911–1995), Italian librarian and translator.
- Gillo Dorfles (1910–2018), philosopher and historian.
- Arturo Falaschi (1933–2010), MD, geneticist.
- Alessandro Ferrara (born 1953), philosopher and author.
- Boris Furlan (1894–1957), Slovenian legal theorist, translator and politician.
- Anton Füster (1808–1881), Austrian revolutionary activist, author and pedagogue.
- Guido Goldschmiedt (1850–1915), Austrian chemist.
- Boris M. Gombač (born 1945), Slovenian historian.
- Spiridon Gopčević (1855–1928), Serbian astronomer and historian.
- Margherita Hack (1922–2013), Italian astronomer.
- Albert O. Hirschman (1915–2012), economist and political scientist; obtained his doctorate from the University of Trieste.
- Pietro Kandler (1804–1872), historian, archaeologist and jurist.
- Fiorella Kostoris (born 1945), economist.
- Doro Levi (1899–1991), archaeologist.
- Neli Niklsbacher Bregar (1912–1982), Slovenian embroiderer, ethnologist, and author.
- Salvatore Pincherle (1853–1936), Italian mathematician.
- Jože Pirjevec (born 1940), Slovene historian.
- Alessandro Pizzorno (1924–2019), political scientist and sociologist.
- Abdus Salam (1926–1996), Pakistani theoretical physicist, Nobel prize laureate.
- Francesco Salata (1876–1944), Italian historian.
- Denis Sciama (1926–1999), British physicist.
- Joseph Straus (born 1938), property law intellectual.
- Marta Verginella (born 1960), Slovene historian.
- Ivan Vidav (1918–2015), Slovene mathematician.
- Edoardo Weiss (1889–1970), Jewish psychoanalyst.
- Guido Weiss (1928–2021), mathematician.
- Sigismund Zois (1747–1819), Slovene mecenate and natural scientist.

== Sportspeople ==
- Andrea de Adamich (born 1941), former Formula 1 driver.
- Nino Benvenuti (born 1938), boxer.
- Biaggio Chianese (born 1961), boxer.
- Claudia Coslovich (born 1972), athlete.
- Fabio Cudicini (1935–2025), football player, goalkeeper.
- Gabriele De Nuzzo (born 1999), football player
- Aldo Dorigo (1929–2025), football player.
- Giorgio Ferrini (1939–1976), football player.
- Ambrogio Fogar (1941–2005), sailor, rally driver, and adventurer.
- Livio Franceschini (1913–1975), basketball player.
- Sara Gama (born 1989), Italian footballer, defender and captain of both Serie A club Juventus and the Italian national team.
- Sandro Gamba (born 1932), basketball coach and player.
- Matteo Gladig (1880–1915), chess master.
- Margherita Granbassi (born 1979), foil fencer.
- Duilio Loi (1929–2008), boxer.
- Cesare Maldini (1932–2016), former AC Milan captain, Italian football team manager.
- Giovanni Martinolich (1884–1910), chess master.
- Mauro Milanese (born 1971), football player.
- Mario Milano (1935–2016), professional wrestler.
- Tiberio Mitri (1926–2001), boxer.
- Uberto De Morpurgo (1896–1961), Austrian-born Italian tennis player.
- Giorgio Oberweger (1913–1998), athlete.
- Nicola Princivalli (born 1979), football player.
- Giovanni Raicevich (1881–1957), professional wrestler.
- Carlo Rigotti (1906–1983), football player.
- Nereo Rocco (1912–1979), football player and manager.
- Licio Rossetti (1925–1993), football player.
- Cesare Rubini (1923–2011), water polo player.
- Matteo Scozzarella (born 1988), football player.
- Giovanni Steffè (1928–2016), rower.
- Caterina Stenta (born 1987), Windsurf and Standup paddleboarding athlete.
- Max Tonetto (born 1974), football player.
- Fabio Tuiach (born 1980), boxer.
- Ferruccio Valcareggi (1919–2005), football player and coach.
- Renzo Vecchiato (born 1955), basketball player.

== Statesmen and aristocracy ==
- Mathilde Bonaparte (1820–1904), Napoleon's niece, daughter of his brother Jérôme Bonaparte; born in Trieste in 1820.
- Joseph Fouché (1759–1820), duke of Otranto, spent his last 5 years exiled in Trieste.
- Maximilian of Habsburg (1832–1867), Emperor of Mexico, Archduke of Austria (Schönbrunn 1832 - Querétaro 1867); built the white castle and park on the riviera; planted plants in the park from his travels around the world.
- Fiorello La Guardia (1882–1947), 99th Mayor of New York City, son of Trieste-born Irene Coen, of the Luzzatto family. Spent part of his 20s in Trieste with his family, also working for the US Consulate.
- Princess Marie Adélaïde de France (1732–1800), Madame de France, daughter of King Louis XV of France, died in Trieste in 1800 and was buried at San Giusto Cathedral.
- Princess Marie Louise Thérèse Victoire de France (1733–1799), Madame de France, daughter of King Louis XV of France, died in Trieste in 1799.
- Manto Mavrogenous (1796–1848), Greek princess and heroine of the Greek War of Independence.
- Louis Antoine Debrauz de Saldapenna (1811–1871), Austrian diplomat, journalist and author.
- Gottfried von Banfield (1890–1986), top Austrian Empire fighter ace in World War I.
- Stefano Černetić (born 1960), journalist and royal pretender.
