= Bogosavac =

Bogosavac Богосавац (Serbian)
- Village (Selo)
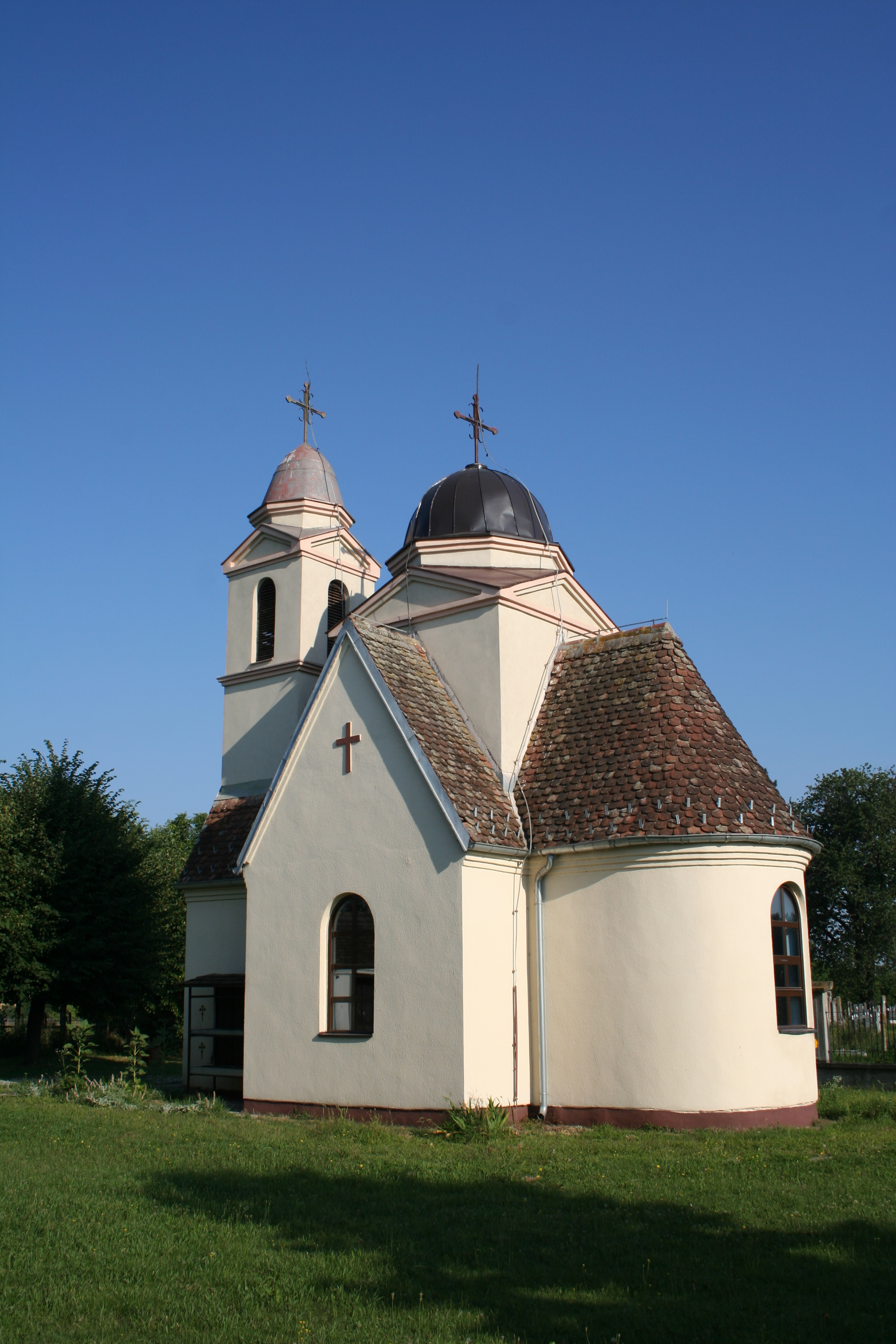

- Location within Serbia
- Coordinates: 44°43′N 19°36′E
- Country: Serbia
- District: Mačva District
- Municipality: Šabac
- Time zone: UTC+1 (CET)
  - Summer (DST): UTC+2 (CEST)

Bogosavac (Serbian Cyrillic: Богосавац) is a village in the Šabac municipality in western Serbia. The village has a Serb ethnic majority and its population numbers 1,012 people (2022 census).

== Culture ==
After World War II, the football club Sloga ("Unity") was established, competing since in the lower leagues.

The local Orthodox church was built in the late 1980s from local contribution. It is dedicated to the Virgin Mary.

== Anthropology ==
Larger families living in Bogosavac are the Srnić, Marinković, Vučetić, and Jovanić.

== See also ==
- List of places in Serbia
- Mačva
