= Valdoni =

Valdoni is a surname. Notable people with the surname include:

- Antonio Valdoni (1834–1890), Italian painter
- Pietro Valdoni (1900–1976), Italian surgeon
