= Moritz August von Thümmel =

German humorist and satirical author (1738–1817)

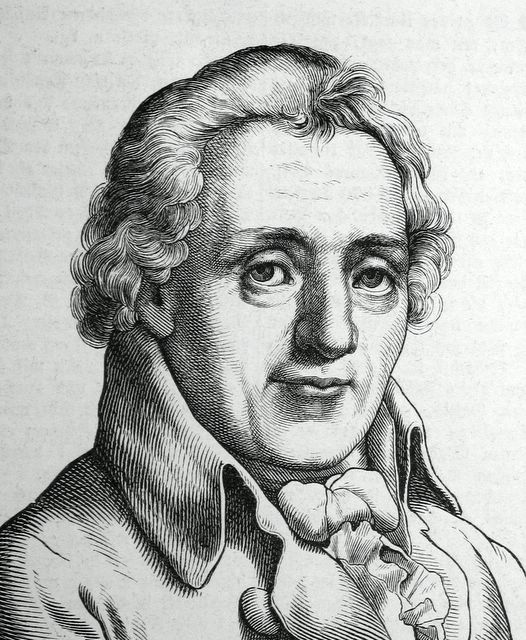
Moritz von Thümmel

Moritz August von Thümmel (1738–1817) was a German humorist and satirical author.

== Life ==
Thümmel was born on 27 May 1738 at Schönefeld near Leipzig. Educated at Roßleben, Thuringia and the University of Leipzig, where he studied law, from 1761 until 1783 he held various offices in the ducal court of Saxe-Coburg, where he became privy councillor and minister of state.

He wrote a comic prose epic, Wilhelmine, oder der vermählte Pedant (1764); and Die Inoculation der Liebe (1771), a tale in verse. His most famous work is his Reise in die mittäglichen Provinzen van Frankreich im Jahre 1785–1786 (1791–1805), a "sentimental journey" in ten volumes, in which the influence of Wieland is unmistakable. Schiller, in his essay "On Naïve and Sentimental Poetry", found this work wanting in aesthetic dignity yet allowed that the keen knowledge of men and things it displays makes it a valuable contribution to literature. Thümmel's other writings are not as well known.

Thümmel retired in 1783 and died in Coburg on 26 October 1817. Early 20th-century painter Vito Timmel descended from him.

== Works ==
His collected works were published in Leipzig in eight volumes (1811–1839), with a biography by Johann E. von Gruner in volume 8 (1820), and again in 1856. See also Felix Bobertag, Erzählende Prosa der klassischen Periode, vol. i. (Joseph Kürschner's Deutsche Nationaltiteratur, vol. cxxxvi, 1886). Wilhelmine has also been edited by Richard Rosenbaum (1894), and has been translated into English by John Raymond Russell (1998).
