= Jovanić =

Jovanić is a South Slavic patronymic surname derived from the given name Jovan. Notable people with the surname include:

- Đoko Jovanić (1917–2000), Yugoslavian general
- Mićun Jovanić, Croatian footballer
- Milan Jovanić, Serbian footballer
- Ognjen Jovanić, Croatian chess player
