= Frances Slanger =

American military nurse

Frances Y. Slanger (born Friedel Yachet Schlanger, 1913 – October 21, 1944) was an American military nurse of Polish Jewish birth. One of many American nurses to die due to enemy fire in the European theatre of World War II, she gained posthumous recognition for a letter she had written regarding the sacrifices of American soldiers which was published as an editorial in the military newspaper Stars and Stripes.

== Early life ==
A native of Łódź, Slanger came with her family to the United States in 1920; they lived in Roxbury, Massachusetts. Her father had already emigrated shortly before she was born; he was a fruit peddler, and she assisted him in his business while attending high school. Choosing to become a nurse, she enrolled in the Boston City Hospital School of Nursing, from which she graduated in 1937; she then began working in hospitals. She enlisted in the Army Nurse Corps in 1943, and thanks to persistent requests was deployed to Europe in 1944. Assigned to the 45th Field Hospital, she was one of four military nurses to enter Normandy after D-Day. She soon gained recognition for her ability to improvise under pressure and for her compassion towards those in her care.

== Letter and death ==
On October 21, 1944, Slanger submitted a letter to Stars and Stripes, the military newspaper:

It is 0200, and I have been lying awake for an hour listening to the steady breathing of the other three nurses in the tent, thinking about some of the things we had discussed during the day.

The fire was burning low, and just a few live coals are on the bottom. With the slow feeding of wood and finally coal, a roaring fire is started. I couldn't help thinking how similar to a human being a fire is. If it is not allowed to run down too low, and if there is a spark of life left in it, it can be nursed back. So can a human being. It is slow. It is gradual. It is done all the time in these field hospitals and other hospitals at the ETO.

We had several articles in different magazines and papers sent in by grateful GIs praising the work of the nurses around the combat zones. Praising us – for what?

We wade ankle-deep in mud – you have to lie in it. We are restricted to our immediate area, a cow pasture or a hay field, but then who is not restricted?

We have a stove and coal. We even have a laundry line in the tent.

The wind is howling, the tent waving precariously, the rain beating down, the guns firing, and me with ta flashlight writing. It all adds up to a feeling of unrealness. Sure we rough it, but in comparison to the way you men are taking it, we can't complain nor do we feel that bouquets are due us. But you – the men behind the guns, the men driving our tanks, flying our planes, sailing our ships, building bridges – it is to you we doff our helmets. To every GI wearing the American uniform, for you we have the greatest admiration and respect.

Yes, this time we are handing out the bouquets – but after taking care of some of your buddies, comforting them when they are brought in, bloody, dirty with the earth, mud and grime, and most of them so tired. Somebody's brothers, somebody's fathers, somebody's sons, seeing them gradually brought back to life, to consciousness, and their lips separate into a grin when they first welcome you. Usually they say, "hiya babe, Holy Mackerel, an American woman" – or more indiscreetly "How about a kiss?"

These soldiers stay with us but a short time, from ten days to possibly two weeks. We have learned a great deal about our American boy and the stuff he is made of. The wounded do not cry. Their buddies come first. The patience and determination they show, the courage and fortitude they have is sometimes awesome to behold. It is we who are proud of you, a great distinction to see you open your eyes and with that swell American grin, say "Hiya, Babe."

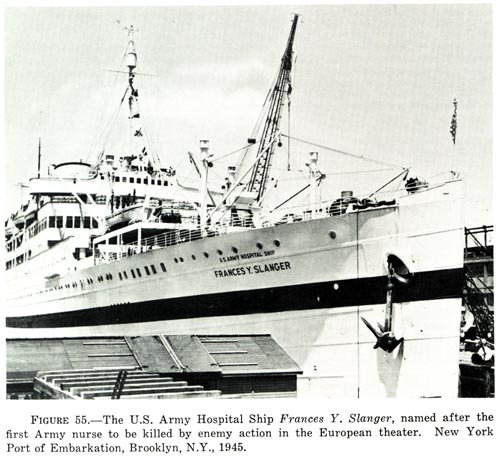
The USAHS Frances Y. Slanger in 1945.

When the letter arrived at the magazine, the staff were so impressed that they chose to publish it as an editorial. It quickly found popularity, proving so inspirational that many readers, military and civilian alike, wrote to her to thank her for her sentiments. But Slanger never saw the acclaim her letter received; hours after writing it, she was killed by a barrage of artillery in the field, becoming the only American nurse to fall to enemy action in the European theater of the war. It was reported that even as she was dying, she expressed concern for those others who had been injured in the fighting. Slanger died in Elsenborn, Belgium. Initially buried in France, in a military cemetery, her remains were repatriated in 1947, to be reinterred at the Independent Pride of Boston Cemetery in Roxbury. Boston's mayor was among the thousands who paid their respects at the ceremony.

== Legacy and honors ==
Slanger was posthumously awarded the Purple Heart, and in 1945 became the namesake of an army hospital ship, the USAHS Frances Y. Slanger, which had been converted from the Italian ocean liner Saturnia earlier that year. The ship was later returned to Italy. She is also the namesake of the Lt. Frances Y. Slanger Post #313 of the Jewish War Veterans of the United States of America, the first post of that group to be named for a woman. She is the subject of a book, American Nightingale: The Story of Frances Slanger, Forgotten Heroine of Normandy, by journalist Bob Welch. A collection of archival material related to Slanger's life and career is currently held by the Howard Gotlieb Archival Research Center at Boston University.
