= Gino Parin =

Italian painter

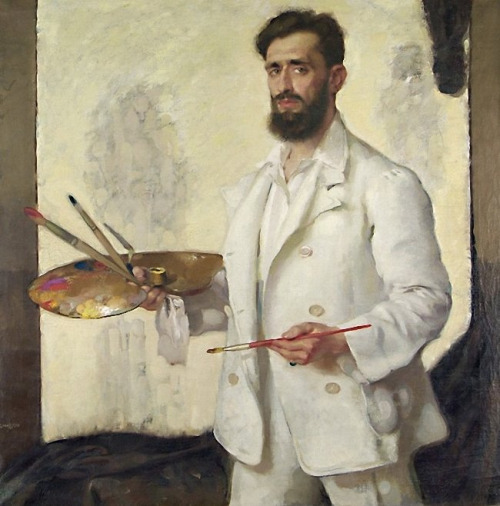
Self-portrait (1900s)

Federico Guglielmo Jehuda Pollack, known as Gino Parin (25 August 1876 in Trieste – 9 June 1944 in Bergen-Belsen) was an Italian painter of Jewish ancestry, a Catholic convert, and a Swiss citizen; known primarily for his portraits of women. He was also known as Friedrich Pollak or Polak.

== Biography ==
Gino Parin was born on 25 August 1876 in Trieste, then a part of the Austro-Hungarian Empire. His parents, Lodovico and Berta, were German-speaking Ashkenazi Jews who settled in Trieste sometime in the mid-19th century. The Pollack family became distinguished members of the upper middle class of Trieste through their family shipping business.

He began his studies in his home town with Eugenio Scomparini (who may have inspired his pseudonym), then attended the Accademia di Belle Arti di Venezia. He finished his studies at the Academy of Fine Arts, Munich with Karl Raupp. It was there that he had his first exhibition. At first, he was mostly a caricaturist; satirizing the conventional German bourgeoisie.

While visiting Paris, he met Ella Auler (1875–1962), an artist and musician from St. Louis, Missouri. Later, they were married. Ella and their son, Edgar, emigrated to the United States and, together with his wife, Ingri, became a noted writer and illustrator of children's books.

When he returned to Trieste, he began painting portraits; producing a long series devoted to the families of Ernesto Lackenbacher, an executive with Riunione Adriatica di Sicurtà (a Joint-stock company), and Moise Mario Tedeschi (1853–1919), an engineer. In 1913, he won a gold medal at the XI Internationalen Kunstausstellung in the Glaspalast.

Between the wars, he exhibited in Vienna (where he was a member of the Hagenbund) and Trieste, and had two showings at the Biennale di Venezia. He also attended exhibitions overseas and was awarded another gold medal at the Internazionale Quadriennale of Turin in 1923.

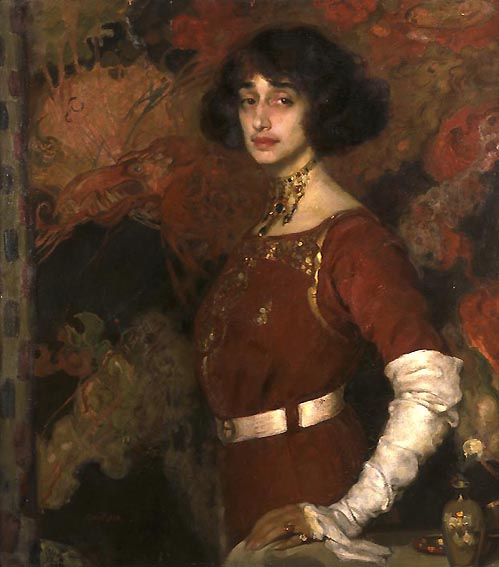
Portrait of Fanny Tedeschi

He maintained close ties with Germany, although the racial laws prohibited him from exhibiting there after 1938. When he was a young man, he had acquired Swiss citizenship and was a legal resident of Campo Blenio. Nevertheless, he was detained in Italy and deported to the concentration camp at Bergen-Belsen. Along the way, he became seriously ill and died shortly after arriving.
