= Vito Timmel =

Austrian painter (1886–1949)

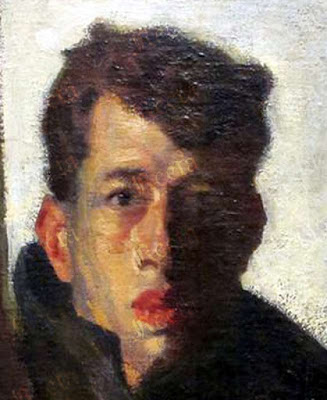
- Self-portrait, 1910
- Born: 19 July 1886; Vienna, Austria
- Died: 1 January 1949 (aged 62); Trieste, Free Territory of Trieste
- Education: University of Applied Arts Vienna; Academy of Fine Arts Vienna
- Known for: Painter, graphic artist, draftsman and decorator
- Movement: Vienna Secession; Symbolism

Vito Timmel (born Viktor von Thümmel; 19 July 1886 – 1 January 1949) was an Italian painter.

== Biography ==
Viktor von Thümmel was a son of Raphael von Thümmel, a descendant of the Leipzig writer Moritz August von Thümmel, and the Countess Adele Scodellari from Friuli. Thanks to an inheritance, the family moved to Trieste, which then belonged to Austria, in 1890, where his mother founded a fashion shop in Piazza della Borsa.

From 1901 Thümmel attended the state trade school (Scuola per Capi d'Arte) in Trieste and learned the basics of painting from, among others, Eugenio Scomparini. In 1905 he went to the University of Applied Arts Vienna and in 1906 to the Academy of Fine Arts Vienna, where he came into contact with contemporary trends in painting, namely the Vienna Secession and Symbolism. In 1910, as part of his Grand Tour, he sojourned in the cities of Venice, Florence and Rome and then returned to Trieste. In 1909/1910 he completed the one-year military service in the Austro-Hungarian army.

Thümmel exhibited in Arezzo and Munich in 1910 and in Naples in 1913. In August 1914 he married Maria Ceresar, who died of tuberculosis in 1918. They had a son born in 1915. In 1921 he married Giulia Tomè.

Timmel worked as a painter, graphic artist, draftsman and decorator. In 1913 he decorated Trieste's Cinema Italia with a series of pictures, which were later transferred to the Revoltella Museum of Trieste, and painted the Theater of Monfalcone. During the First World War in 1916 he was drafted into the k.u.k. infantry regiment "von Waldstätten" No. 97 and was stationed in Radkersburg. Far away from all fronts, he could also paint there. Indeed, together with Argio Orell he realized the mural paintings of the club Bohem.

In the 1920s he developed an active painting activity and exhibited in Trieste and in various Italian cities. He then went astray, left his family and installed himself as a painter in Civitavecchia. His girlfriend Anita Pittoni (1901–1982) brought him back to Trieste. In the 1930s, his mental health deteriorated. Timmel was treated as an inpatient in the psychiatry from 1946. He kept a diary from which excerpts were edited in 1973.

The play La mostra by Claudio Magris, published in 2001, is about Timmel's disease. It was brought to the stage by Antonio Calenda in 2006, with Roberto Herlitzka playing the painter that year. In 2006 Calenda restaged the play, again with Herlitzka as Timmel.

== Gallery ==
Selected paintings

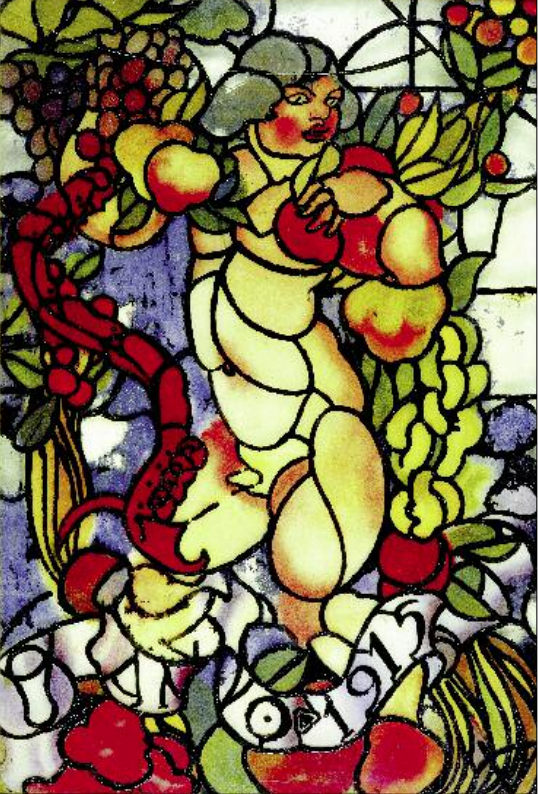
Amazon, 1915

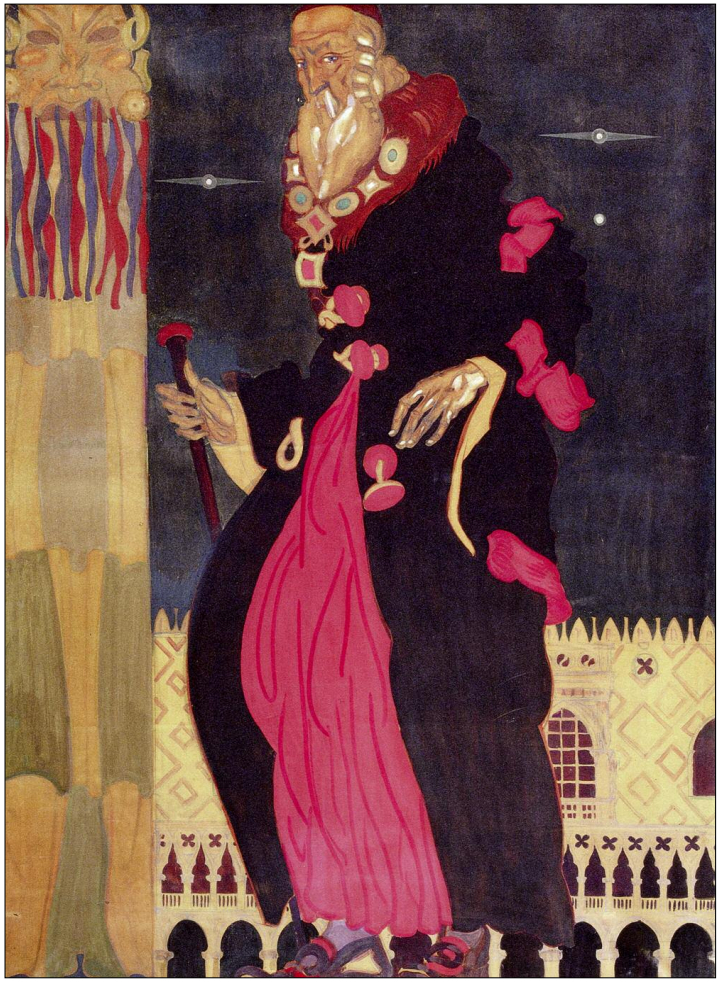
Sylok, 1916

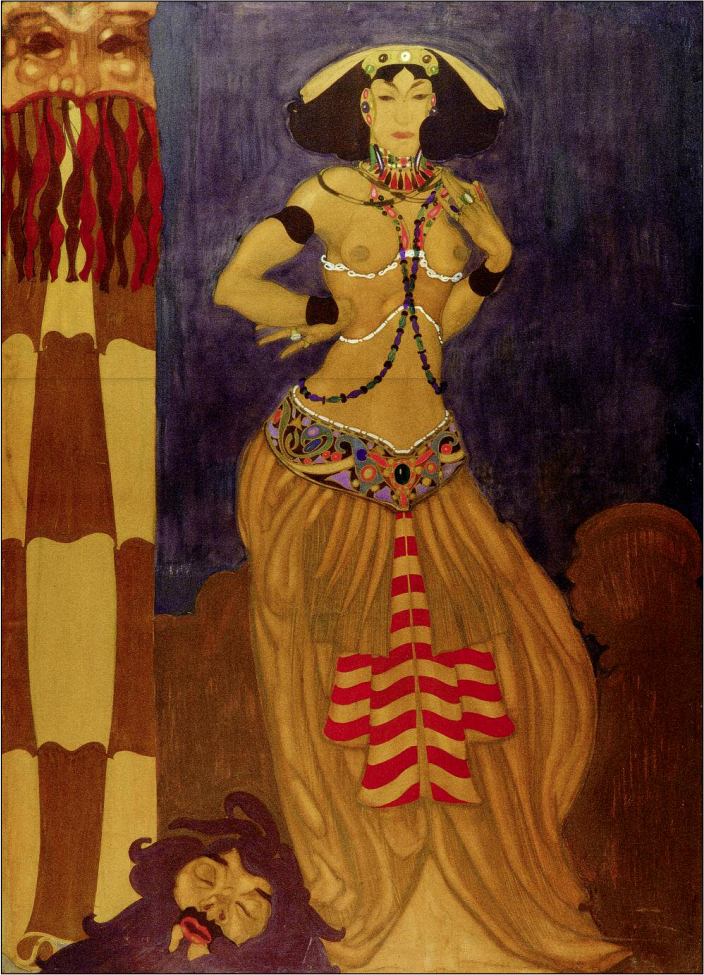
Salomé, 1916

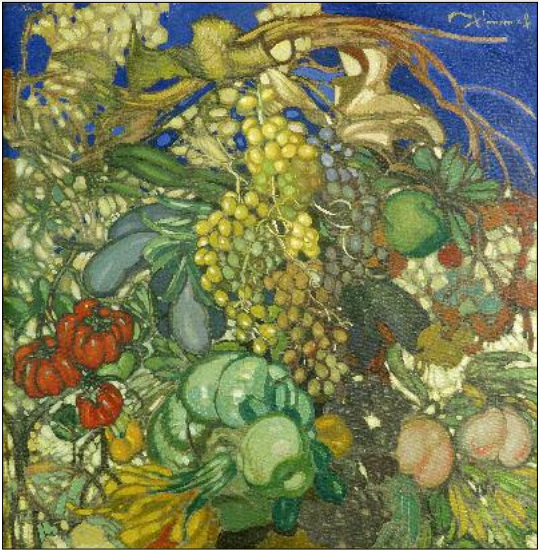
Still-life, ca. 1924

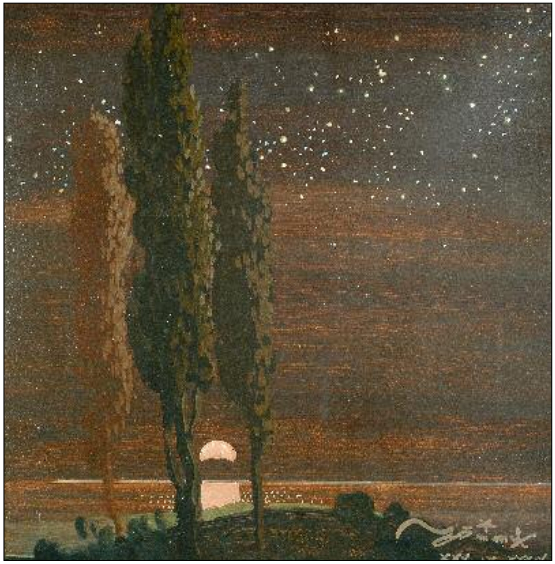
Il sorgere della luna sul mare, 1934

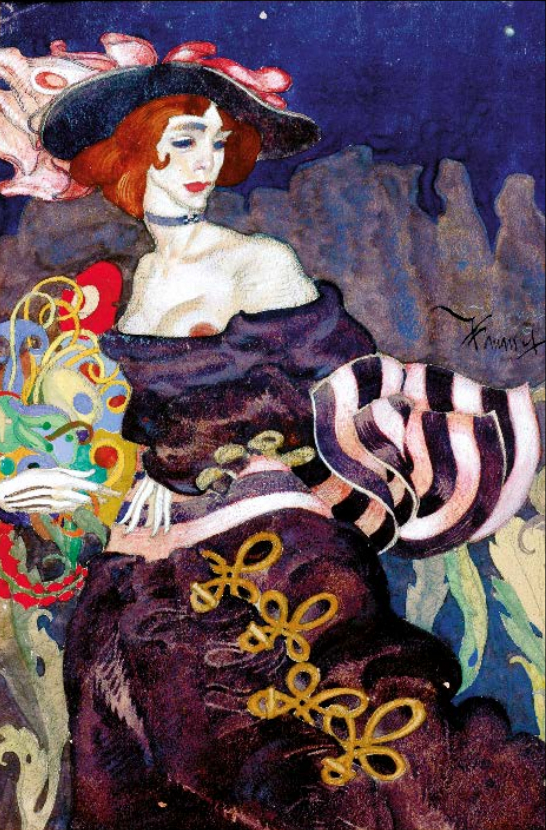
The Wayfarer, 1936

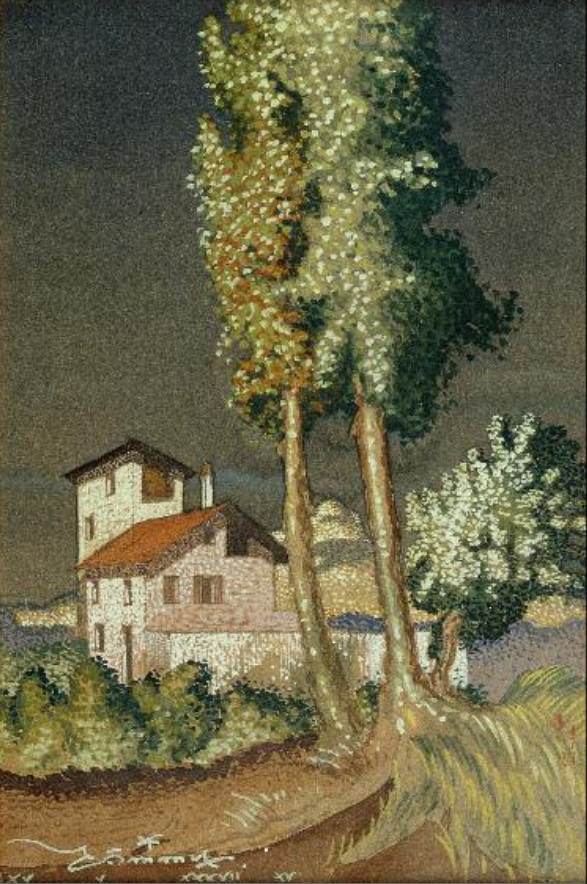
Casolari dietro due alberi, 1937

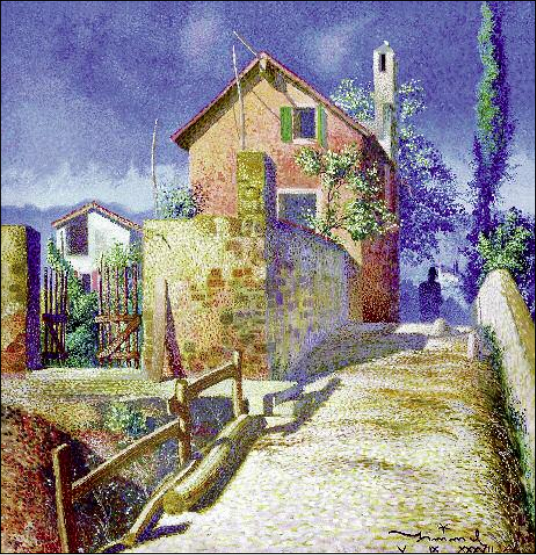
Wayfarer on the Bottom of the Path, 1937

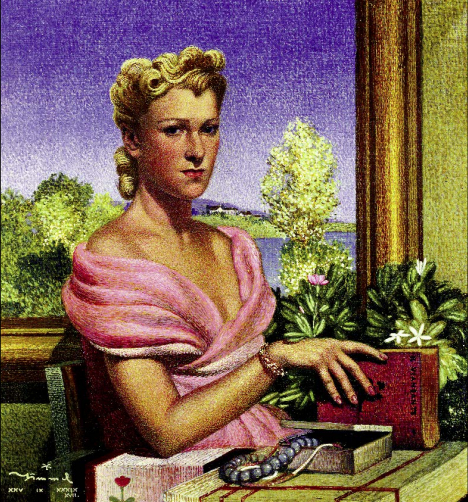
Lady in Pink, 1939

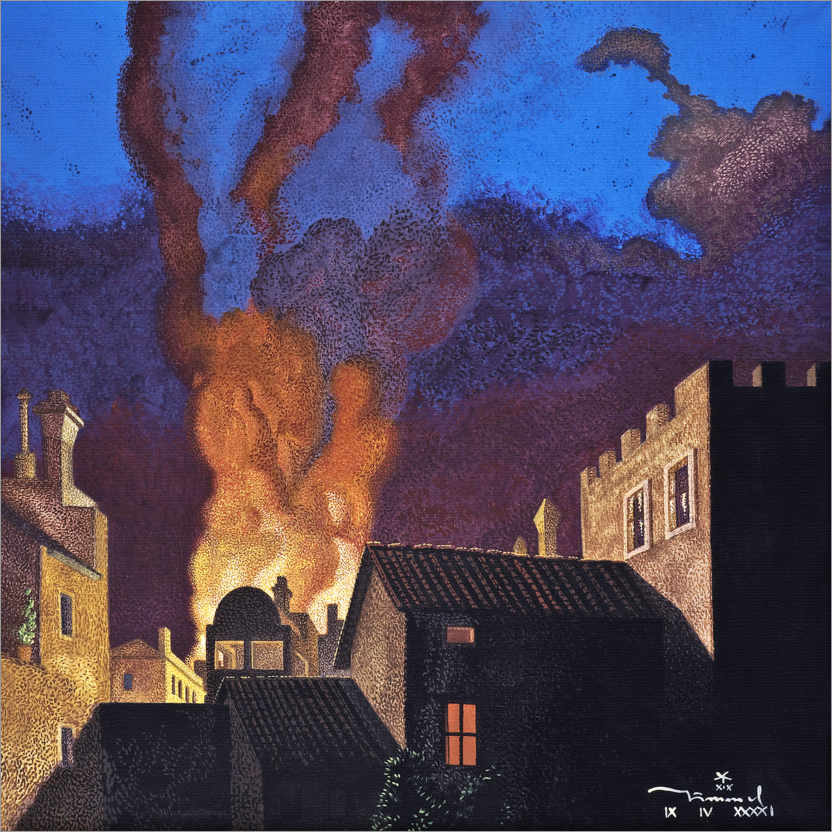
Fire in the Balkans, 1941

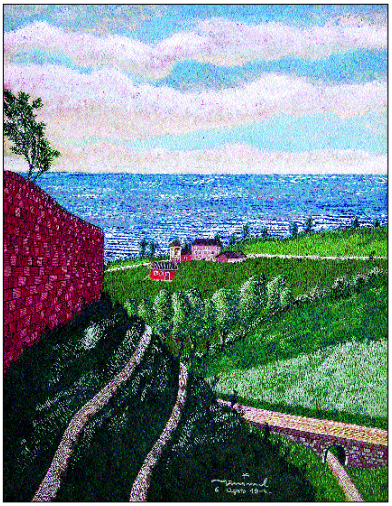
Landscape, 1944
