= MS Saturnia =

Italian ocean liner later converted to troopship and later hospital ship

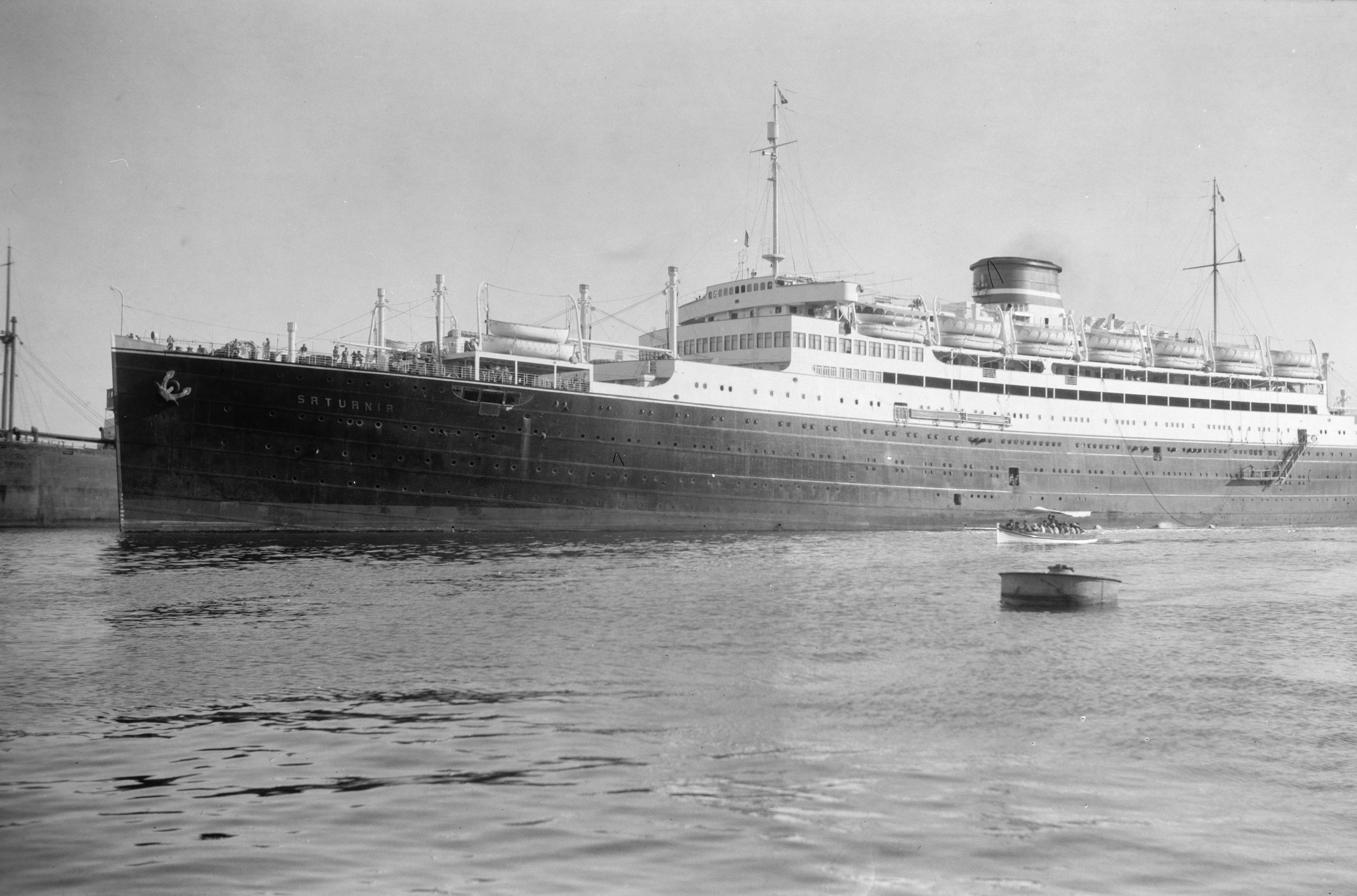
- Saturnia as Italian troop ship passing through Suez Canal, Sept. 1935.

History
- Name: Saturnia
- Owner: Cosulich Soc. Triestina di Nav., Trieste (1925—1932); Italia Flotte Riunite (1932—1937); Società Anonima di Navigazione Italia (1937—1943)
- Operator: Cosulich Soc. Triestina di Nav., Trieste (1925—1932); Italia Flotte Riunite (1932—1937); Società Anonima di Navigazione Italia (1937—1943)
- Port of registry: Trieste, Italy
- Builder: Cantieri Riuniti dell'Adriatico, Monfalcone, Trieste
- Yard number: 160
- Laid down: 5 March 1925
- Launched: 19 December 1925
- Maiden voyage: 21 September 1927
- Fate: Delivered 18 November 1943 to U.S. War Shipping Administration by Italian Government.

History
- Name: Saturnia (1943-1945); Frances Y. Slanger (1945); Saturnia (1946)
- Owner: War Shipping Administration (1943-1945)
- Operator: War Shipping Administration (1943-1945); U.S. Army (1945-1946)
- Fate: Returned to Italian Government 19 November 1946
- Notes: Bareboat charter, Army, 1945—1946. USAHS 1945 becoming USAT Saturnia 1946 on conversion to transport.

History
- Name: Saturnia
- Port of registry: Genoa (1946—1955); Trieste (1955-1965)
- Acquired: From WSA 19 November 1946
- In service: 1946
- Out of service: 1965
- Fate: Scrapped in 1965 at La Spezia

General characteristics
- Type: Ocean liner
- Tonnage: 23,940 GRT, 14,441 NRT
- Length: 631.4 ft (192.5 m) (Registry)
- Beam: 79.8 ft (24.3 m)
- Draught: 29.05 ft (8.9 m)
- Depth: 29.5 ft (9.0 m) (hold); 46.6 ft (14.2 m) (molded)
- Decks: 4 + 1 in #1 hold + shade deck
- Propulsion: Original: 2 × Burmeister & Wain SCDA diesel, 8,379 n.h.p.; 2 × screw; After December 1935: 2 × Sulzer diesels, 41,000 b.h.p. total
- Speed: Original: 19.25 kn (22.15 mph; 35.65 km/h) (service), 21 kn (24 mph; 39 km/h) (full); After December 1935: 22 kn (25 mph; 41 km/h)

MV Saturnia was an Italian ocean liner named after Saturnia, Tuscany, the first of two sister ships built in Trieste for Cosulich Soc. Triestina di Nav. of Trieste and launched in 1925. Sister ship MS Vulcania was launched the next year. Saturnia served into World War II for Italy and upon the Italian armistice with the Allies was delivered to the U.S. War Shipping Administration (WSA) in an arrangement made between Italy and Admiral Cunningham of the Royal Navy, approved by General Eisenhower.

Saturnia sailed from Italy to New York with an Italian crew and was delivered to WSA on 18 November 1943. The ship first served under a WSA agent after conversion into a troop ship allocated to U.S. Army requirements but in January 1945 began conversion into a hospital ship under U.S. Army bareboat charter from WSA. After conversion into USAHS Frances Y. Slanger, the ship departed New York in July 1945 for France to embark patients. In December 1945 the hospital ship was retired and converted from 24 January to 21 February 1946 into a dependent transport as USAT Saturnia.

In November 1946 Saturnia was delivered to the Italian government to return to commercial service until March 1965. The ship was scrapped in October 1965.

== Construction and characteristics ==
Saturnia was laid down by Cantieri Riuniti dell'Adriatico, Monfalcone, Trieste as hull number 160 on 5 March 1925 for Cosulich Soc. Triestina di Nav. (Cosulich Line), Trieste. The ship was launched 29 December 1925 with a maiden voyage from Trieste to the River Plate ports on 21 September 1927. (Note: Buenos Aires, Argentina and Montevideo, Uruguay are the major ports on the estuary.)

The ship's registered characteristics were for a ship with four full decks, a shade deck and fifth deck in number one hold, of 23,940 GRT, 14,441 NRT, 631.4 ft (192.5 m) registry length, 79.8 ft (24.3 m) beam, 29.5 ft (9.0 m) hold depth and 46.6 ft (14.2 m) molded depth and 29.05 ft (8.9 m) draught. Saturnia was assigned signal ICGZ and was equipped with Sperry Gyro-Compass and Sperry Gyro-Pilot, radio direction finder, and submarine signals for navigation. (Note: References Cooke and Charles give a length over all of 632 ft (192.6 m) and 631 ft 3 in (192.4 m) respectively. The ship had a relatively plumb bow so that LOA and registry length could be within inches.) Original propulsion was by two 8 cylinder Burmeister & Wain diesel engines developing 8,379 n.h.p. driving the two screws. Serious engine vibration problems in Saturnia required modifications. Extensive modifications to the engine mountings, propellers and other alterations caused a delay in operation of sister ship Vulcania.

Original configuration was for 370 first class, 412 second class, 319 third class and 564 fourth class passengers with a crew of 502. The ship introduced private verandahs for the more luxurious cabins. After conversion to a troop ship Saturnia had a capacity for 3,714 passengers with a cargo capacity of 156,430 cu ft (4,429.6 m^{3}). As a hospital ship capacity was 1,618 patients. On conversion to a dependent transport the ship was equipped to transport 1,131 women and 371 children for a total of 1,502.

== History ==
Cosulich engaged in an intense publicity campaign to advertise the two new ships, which incorporated new artistic movements of the time, by employing period artist Argio Orell, Augusto Cernigoj and Filippo Romoli. (Note: Noted for posters. See for general examples. is an Italia/Cosulich poster.) As part of the advertising for the new ship, associated with Italian nationalist sentiment, was the name, evoking Saturn as ruler of the universe, and associations with the Catholic Church. Cosulich was among the companies emphasizing service to the Holy Land and its advertising for Saturnia and Vulcania emphasized a chapel as "a central feature of the ship" and the '"only vessels in the world authorized to carry the Blessed Sacrament on board at all times."

=== Italian passenger service ===
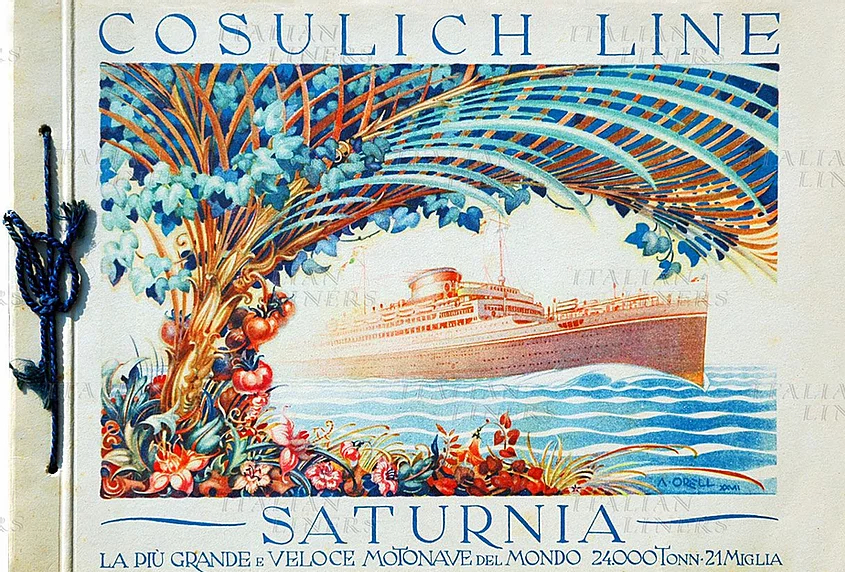
Saturnia brochure by Argio Orell

On 21 September 1927 Saturnia left Trieste on her maiden voyage to the River Plate port. On 1 February 1928, she left for her first North Atlantic crossing to New York. On 16 February the ship arrived to be welcomed by harbor craft, the Mayor's Committee and celebrated by a luncheon.

On 2 January 1932 Cosulich became part of the new line Italia Flotte Riunite but maintains its separate administrative office in Trieste. The ships assumed the new colors of Italia Flotte Riunite. On 8 May 1935 Saturnia was taken over to serve as a troop ship supporting the Abyssinian war. In December 1935 the ship's original engines were replaced by the builder with Sulzer diesels having a total of 41,000 b.h.p. for a top speed of 22 kn (25 mph; 41 km/h). During this period the baroque interior design was replaced by a more contemporary style including Art Déco and minimalism. Steerage was converted to make more comfortable third class and new tourist class accommodations with advertising targeting the U.S. public. The ship returned to regular service in August 1936. On 2 January 1937 Italia Flotte Riunite is assumed by Società Anonima di Navigazione Italia (Italian Line), Genoa with the Cosulich ships transferred and that company placed in liquidation.

Saturnia engaged in routine commercial routes and cruises before and as tensions rise in Europe. In October 1939 the ship was stopped by the British off Gibraltar attempting to confiscate a cargo of copper and steel for Bohemia. The cargo was thrown overboard. In December a French submarine stopped the ship and took off seven German Jewish passengers. On 30 April 1940 the ship was adapted for a special voyage to Tripoli with arrival back at Syracuse, Sicily 10 June 1940 the day Italy entered the war.

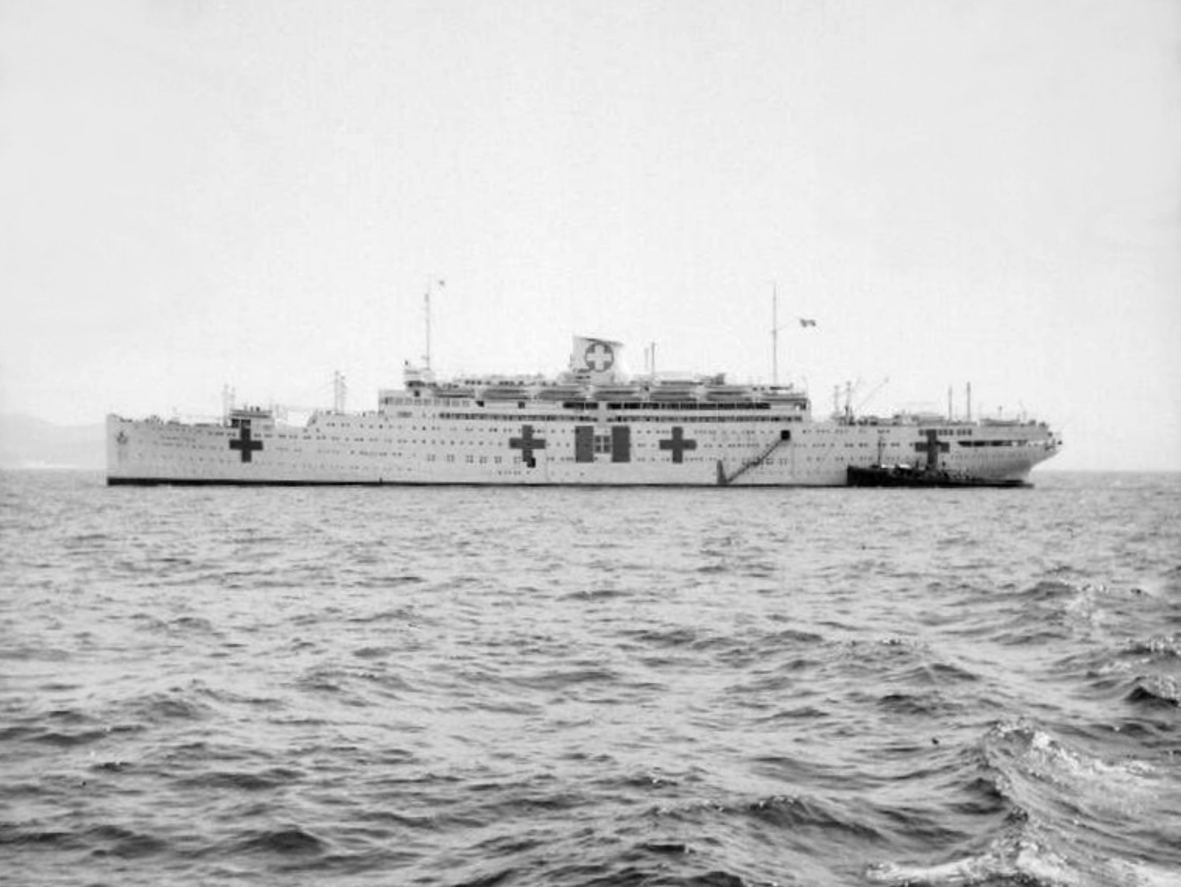
MV Saturnia in 1943. The ship was engaged in repatriation of Italian civilians from East Africa under the Red Cross.

The ship was laid up at Genoa with one short voyage until February 1942 when modifications were made to meet an agreement with the International Red Cross for repatriation of Italian civilian colonist interned by the British in former Italian East African colonies. In accordance with the agreement and Red Cross requirements the modifications included painting the ships white, with red crosses on the sides and blue disks with white crosses on the funnel. The requirement also included bright illumination of the ship so that the emblems would be seen at night. (Note: The photo of the ship in 1943 reflects this period with Red Cross symbols, white paint and the Italian flag highly visible.) On 4 April 1942 Saturnia departed Trieste to join Vulcania two days later south of Majorca. The ships cleared Gibraltar on 8 April and arrived at São Vicente, Cape Verde for refueling on 12 April. With a stop at Port Elizabeth the ships reach Berbera in what was then British Somaliland on 5 May in the first of a series of voyages repatriating Italian civilians.

Saturnia and Vulcania were joined by Giulio Cesare and Duilio for the second repatriation trip to East Africa leaving Genoa on 21 October 1942 and ending at Brindisi on 12 January 1943. The four ships made the third and last repatriation voyage departing Trieste on 22 May and ending at Taranto on 11 August 1943.

=== Turn over to United States ===
Saturnia arrived in Trieste on 4 September 1943. After the armistice between the Allies and Italy on 13 October 1943 the ship is ordered to sail to Venice where cadets of the Naval Academy embarked. (Note: The academy had been moved from Venice earlier. Other cadets aboard Vulcania were, at the demand of the pro Fascist director of the Naval Academy and Naval command at Pula, disembarked cadets at Brioni from where they went to concentration camps.) At risk of seizure there by the Germans the ship sailed for Brindisi on 10 September arriving the next day. During this period Saturnia was requisitioned by the Royal Italian Government. At Brindisi, in an agreement with Italy and Admiral Cunningham of the Royal Navy, approved by General Eisenhower, Saturnia was delivered to the Allies for use by the United States. The ship left Taranto on 14 October and with stops at Malta and Algiers reached Gibraltar. For safety the ship was to be taken out of the Mediterranean and the War Shipping Administration (WSA) accepted the ship for operation. Convoy records show Saturnia in Convoy MKF 25 leaving Algiers 27 October for the River Clyde in Scotland, arriving on 5 November. The ship sailed to New York with an Italian crew where on 18 November 1943 Saturnia was delivered by the Italian Government to the War Shipping Administration (WSA).

==== WSA troop ship ====
Simultaneously the ship was placed in operation under a WSA agent, American Export Lines, Inc., under a U.S. Army Transportation Corps Agreement (TCA) allocated to Army requirements. Conversion of the ship to a troop ship was at New York and in March 1944 Saturnia began those duties with two voyages to England and a third to Cherbourg, France. The third voyage transported the 101st Infantry Regiment (A sub-division of the 26th Infantry Division) leaving New York on 27 August 1944 and arriving in Cherbourg on 7 September 1944. On the return trip of third voyage Saturnia required minor repairs in England due to a collision returning to New York in October. The ship made one trip in November to Southampton then to Marseilles, France and Oran in December with return to New York just before Christmas Day where a conversion to a United States Army Hospital Ship (USAHS) was planned.

==== Army hospital and dependent transport ====
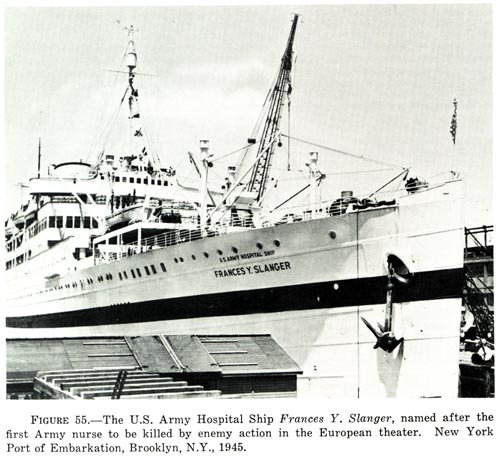
USAHS Frances Y. Slanger docked at New York Harbor in 1945.

The ship was placed by WSA under bareboat charter to the United States Department of War for Army use as a hospital ship on 17 January 1945. Army hospital ships were intended to clear helpless patients from overseas Army hospitals ashore and return them to the United States on Hague Convention protected ships. Ambulatory and other patients normally returned aboard troop transports on their return voyages. Unlike Navy hospital ships, equipped for immediate care of wounded, Army hospital ships focused on a maximum number of berths rather than clinical facilities.

Conversion to the hospital ship, Frances Y. Slanger, was done at the Todd-Erie Basin yard in New York between January and June 1945. The ship was named after Frances Y. Slanger (1913-1944), an American field nurse who was killed in an artillery attack by the German Wehrmacht on 21 October 1944 in Elsenborn, Belgium. She was the first American nurse to die from enemy action in Europe during World War II. The ship was, during service as a hospital ship, the largest and fastest of the Army hospital ships. The ship left New York in July 1945 making four successive trips to Cherbourg to embark patients. In November the ship was sent to Bermuda to assist a vessel in distress.

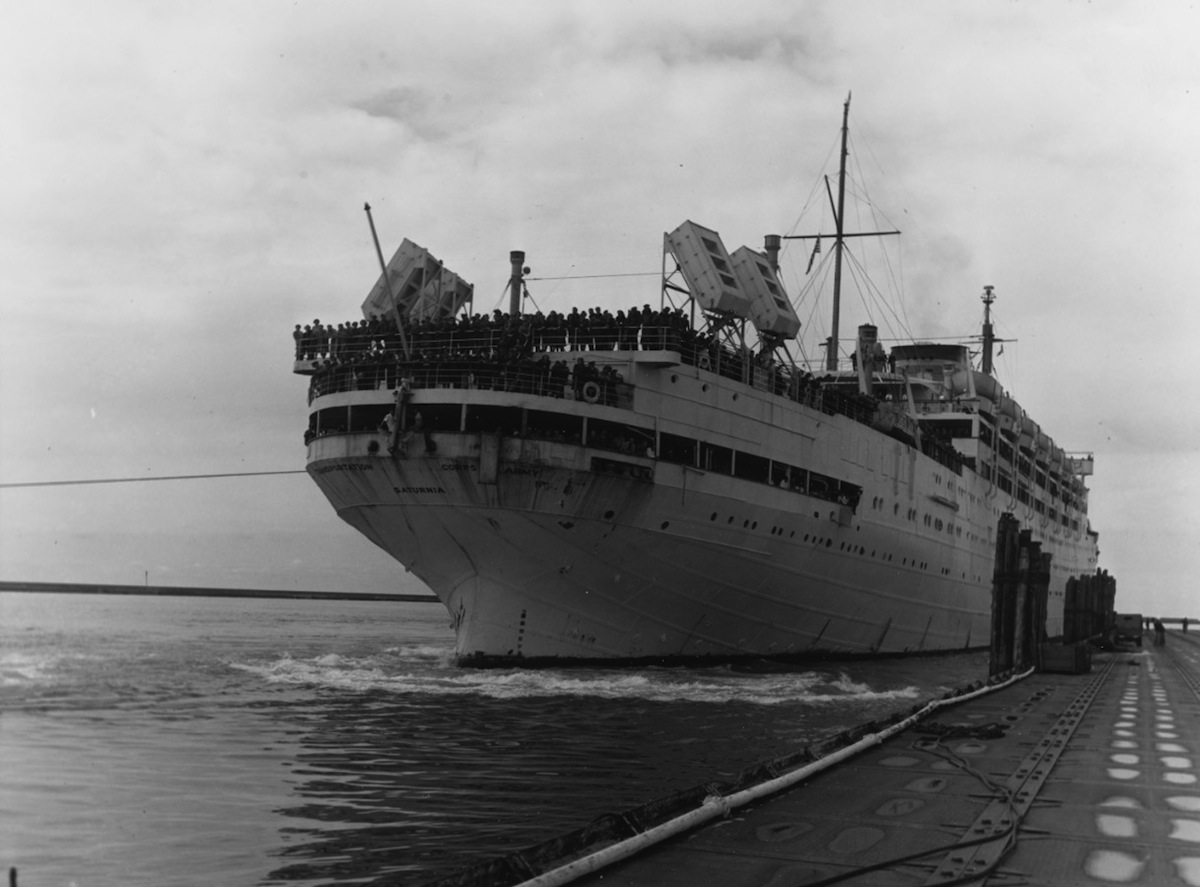
USAT Saturnia at Le Havre, France with "WACs", Air Force personnel, re-enlistees, and replacements, 19 May 1946.

On return to New York in December the ship was hastily modified by the Arthur Tickle Engineering Works to transport military dependents. The conversion was done from 24 January to 21 February 1946 with the name Saturnia restored. The ship was capable of transporting 1,131 women and 371 children and, operating as the United States Army Transport (USAT) Saturnia, began voyages between New York and Southampton.

=== Return to Italian service ===
In November 1946 the ship was returned to Italy and renamed Saturnia again. It was completely overhauled and from then on could carry 240 passengers in first class, 270 in second class and 860 in tourist class. On 21 January 1947 she embarked on her first post-war voyage from Genoa via Naples to New York. Her last journey on this route began on 3 October 1955. On 2 November 1955 Saturnia returned to Trieste for the first time in twelve years and resumes, on 8 November, service from there to New York with port calls at Venice, Patras, Naples, Palermo, Gibraltar, Lisbon and Halifax.

An estimated 265,000 immigrants arrived in Canada and the U.S. from Europe aboard the Saturnia between 1946 and 1965 with a majority arriving at Halifax or New York. Filmmaker Ferdinando Dell’Omo and partner Lilia Topouzova interviewed hundreds of Canadian-Italians who arrived by ship. They found many had arrived on Saturnia and found the story powerful enough to title a documentary film Sarurnia that was built around the ship and its immigrant passengers. A short version of the film aired on Canadian television stations in 2011 with a feature film released by Still Ocean Films Inc., Toronto, in 2012, premiering at the Moving Images Festival in Toronto.

On 10 April 1965 the ship arrived at Trieste to be laid up. On 7 October 1965 she arrived in La Spezia, where she was broken up shortly afterwards.

== See also ==
- Hospital ship
- MS Vulcania
