= Vučetić =

Vučetić (Serbian: Вучетић), also Vucetich, is a Slavic Serbian and Croatian surname derived from the masculine given name Vučeta. It may refer to:

- Branka Vucetic
- Jelena Vučetić (born 1993), Montenegrin Serb basketball player
- Juan Vucetich (1858 – 1925) was a Croatian-Argentine anthropologist and police official who pioneered the use of dactyloscopy (fingerprint identification)
- Mario Mirko Vucetich (1898–1975), Italian artist
- Marko Vučetić (born 1986), Serbian football player
- Mihajlo Vučetić
- Miroslav Vučetić
- Paško Vučetić
- Vasilije Vučetić (born 1995), Serbian basketball player
- Víctor Manuel Vucetich (born 1955), Mexican footballer and manager
- Yevgeny Vuchetich, Russian sculptor
