= Stefano Černetić =

Italian royal impostor (born 1960)

- Born: 29 April 1960 (age 66); Trieste, Italy
- Known for: False claims of royalty
- Spouse: Karola (m. 2017)
- Website: princeofmontenegroandmacedonia.eu

Stefano Černetić (Montenegrin Cyrillic: Стефано Чернетић, Montenegrin pronunciation: [stefano t͡ʃernetit͡ɕ]; born 29 April 1960) is an Italian man known for falsely claiming to be prince of Montenegro and Macedonia. He associated himself with celebrities and royals and awarded false titles of nobility and self-styled orders to celebrities.

In 2016, Italian authorities launched an investigation into him following complaints by the Montenegrin embassy. Černetić was charged with fraud in the court of Turin but was acquitted on the basis that he had never claimed to represent the Republic of Montenegro's government.

== Biography ==
=== Early life ===
Černetić was born on 29 April 1960 in Trieste, Italy. He says that he speaks Italian, Serbo-Croatian, English, French, Spanish, and Russian. He originally worked as a food journalist.

=== Claims of royal heritage and activities ===
Černetić came to prominence after asserting he was Montenegrin royalty. He claimed to be related to the Crnojević noble family, which historically ruled Zeta. He styled himself "His Imperial and Royal Highness Stefan Černetić, Hereditary Prince of Montenegro, Serbia and Albania". As of 2017, he used the Latin motto "In hoc signo vinces". He also claimed to be a prince of Macedonia.

He used his assumed title to associate with high-ranking clergy, businesspeople, and royals, including Albert II, Prince of Monaco. He posted photos taken with these people on social media and his personal website, which helped to build his reputation. During this time, he was paid to attend public events in an official capacity, hosted humanitarian events to promote the culture of the Balkans, and received a medal from Giorgio Napolitano, then President of Italy.

In 2012, he visited the Montalbera Winery in Piedmont and requested that they become an official supplier for his house. The winery produced 1,200 bottles labelled with his coat of arms, but the owner said they did not hear from him afterwards.

In 2013, Černetić was accused of extorting a restaurant owner in Bagno Vignoni who provided newspapers with a cellphone video in which Černetić claimed to be an official representative of Tripadvisor and offered to endorse the restaurant on TripAdvisor in exchange for a fee. In response, Tripadvisor Italy released a statement that they do not send representatives to request payment from restaurants.

While in Italy, Černetić drove a black Mercedes with diplomatic insignia and Montenegrin flags. He bestowed false titles of nobility and self-styled orders on a number of people, including Serbian tennis player Novak Djokovic and American actress Pamela Anderson. He first presented Anderson with an award for her marine conservation work in 2014, and later gave her the title "Countess of Giglio" during a ball at Villa Durazzo in Santa Margherita Ligure in 2015.

In July 2022, then-president of Montenegro Milo Đukanović launched an investigation after Černetić attended his Statehood Day party uninvited. Černetić was photographed at the party with Đukanović and Nicholas, Prince of Montenegro, and was entertained the following day by the Serbian bishop Joanikije Mićović, who also baptised Černetić's son.

=== Fraud investigation and acquittal ===
Černetić and another man, who identified himself as Černetić's ambassador, were charged with fraud by local authorities in Brindisi, Italy in 2016. The investigation began after Montenegrin authorities contacted the Italian ministries of Foreign Affairs and Internal Affairs in 2016. Černetić was accused of falsely obtaining diplomatic license plates. The Montenegrin Embassy also said that a luxury hotel in Fasano had sent them a bill incurred by Černetić, who was not affiliated with the Montenegrin government.

In June 2017, his home in Turin was raided by the Carabinieri as part of an investigation into alleged fraudulent activities dating back to 2009. They found fake diplomatic documents, stamps, and certificates of awards. During the investigation, Italian authorities found that Černetić's parents were Italian and that he was from Trieste. The Italian authorities charged Černetić with falsifying his identity as well as making and possessing false identity documents. During the investigation, Černetić's attorney stated that the certificates and titles issued by Černetić were only intended to represent honors from his family and not the Republic of Montenegro.

In an interview with The Daily Beast published in July 2017, Černetić accused the Petrović-Njegoš dynasty, which ruled Montenegro until 1916, of orchestrating the proceedings against him. He said that the dynasty was "filled with Freemasons" and had bribed journalists to slander him.

In 2023, he was acquitted of fraud charges by the court of Turin, which determined that the actions under investigation were "misleading" but not legally fraudulent. An investigation into the genealogical and heraldic claims of Černetić found that he is related to a noble house that existed in Montenegro and Macedonia during the 17th century. Černetić uses that family's coat of arms, which incidentally bears similarities to the coat of arms of Montenegro. He never claimed to represent the government of Montenegro, and the court ruled that the certificates he issued were not considered legal documents. Instead, the court concluded that the certificates awarded by Černetić were merely souvenirs.

== Personal life ==
On 28 December 2017, Černetić married Karola, a German university professor.
