= Anita Pittoni =

Italian clothing designer, writer and publisher (1901–1982)

- Born: Anita Tosoni Pittoni; 6 May 1901; Trieste, Austro-Hungarian Empire
- Died: 8 May 1982 (aged 81); Trieste, Italy
- Known for: Clothing design and production; book publishing
- Movement: Futurism

Anita Tosoni Pittoni (May 6, 1901 – May 8, 1982) was an Italian textile craftswoman, clothing designer, writer, and publisher. During the 1930s she ran a business in Trieste employing around 90 women who produced clothing from her designs. Forced to give up this work during World War II, in 1949 she established the Lo Zibaldone publishing house in Trieste.

== Early life ==
Pittoni was born, initially with Austrian nationality, on 6 May 1901 in Trieste, then in the Austro-Hungarian Empire, to Angelina Marcolin, a housewife who supplemented the family income by working as a clothes maker and embroiderer, and Francesco Pittoni, an engineer who worked in Trieste's Municipal Technical Office. The eldest of four siblings, she was the niece of Valentino Pittoni, a noted socialist politician who represented Trieste on the Imperial Council in Vienna and through whom she met most of the leading socialists in Trieste. After attending the Trieste Girls' High School, she did not pursue university studies due to her family's poor financial situation following her father's death. In the late 1920s, she began frequenting the photography studio of the sisters Wanda and Marion Wulz, where she first revealed her artistic talent. Through another uncle, Silvio Tosoni Pittoni, she also began to establish contact with the intellectual elite of Trieste of the time.

== Artistic career ==
During a trip to Vienna in 1928 she decided to devote herself to textile craftsmanship. She then chose to leave her family to live with her partner, Giovanni Parovel, who had left his wife and young daughter to be with her, and to open a workshop on the premises of the Wulz sisters. At the time she was reported as saying that "I don’t have half a lira in my pocket because all my capital, 70 lire, I’ve spent: 35 lire on polenta flour and eggs, and 35 lire on wool. Nor do I know who will buy my sweater or when it will happen." In producing her early clothes for sale, she was helped by her mother, who would remain closely associated with Pittoni's business until World War II.

Her early work included a tapestry designed by the Futurist painter Marcello Claris, which was displayed at the First Exhibition of the Sindacato delle Belle Arti e del Circolo Artistico of Trieste in 1927. In the Spring of 1928, she exhibited at the Mostra d’arte decorativa degli Amici del Libro (Exhibition of Decorative Arts of the Friends of Books). Several more of her works would be exhibited in Trieste in 1929 and elsewhere in Italy in the following years. Through Claris, she met Anton Giulio Bragaglia, who would become close to her professionally and personally for the rest of her life. In December 1929, she held her first solo exhibition, at Bragaglia's gallery in Rome, displaying murals, canvases, and theatre costumes. Thanks to Bragaglia, she also exhibited her work at the Circolo Artistico di Via Margutta in Rome in 1929 and designed the costumes for a staging of The Beggar's Opera by Bertolt Brecht, as well as, in Milan in 1930, the first Italian performance of Brecht's and Kurt Weil's The Threepenny Opera, directed by Bragaglia. In the same year she also participated in exhibitions in Milan and Florence. Bragaglia offered her the chance to move to Rome as a set and costume designer in his Teatro dell'Arte, but she did not want to leave Trieste.

In 1929, Pittoni began contributing to the architecture and design magazine Domus, founded by Gio Ponti, with a colour plate of one of her mural panels to be made in fabric inlay. In 1933, she participated in the Fifth Milan Triennial, and the same year she exhibited in Turin at the First National Fashion Exhibition. In 1936, she received the gold medal at the Mostra dell'Artigianato in Milan, and the following year, she won the Grand Prix of the international jury for fabrics and fashion at the Universal Exposition in Paris. In February 1937, her works were shown at the Les femmes artistes d'Europe exhibition, which was devoted solely to works by European women. She had a solo exhibition in Milan in 1942.

== Workshop ==
Pittoni's clothing workshop in Trieste attracted numerous visitors and customers for her work, which is said to be linked by the guiding thread of simplicity of forms, colours, and techniques. Among them was the actress Tatyana Pavlova, who gave Pittoni tickets for every performance while she was in Trieste. In that time, a woman entrepreneur was very unusual but, between 1930 and 1942, Pittoni hired around 90 female workers. Many of these worked from home. Working for Pittoni represented for many a rare opportunity for economic emancipation, but their contracts were very restrictive, protecting Pittoni's intellectual property in terms of the designs and the techniques employed in producing the clothing. The completed pieces had to be delivered on the agreed day and delays meant a fine of 100 lire per day. She hired Lidia Venezian to effectively become the manager of the workshop, although her title was "lead worker", enabling Pittoni to devote herself to designing and training of the workers. She was also often absent from Trieste, giving lessons. After World War II it proved impossible to profitably renew these business activities after outworker legislation changed.

== Publishing ==
In 1949, Pittoni opened the publishing house Lo Zibaldone, with support from writers from Trieste, including Giani Stuparich with whom she had become romantically attached in the 1940s, Virgilio Giotti, Umberto Saba, Italo Svevo , and Pier Antonio Quarantotti Gambini. The house's title probably derived from Zibaldone di pensieri, a work by the Italian writer, Giacomo Leopardi. She published work by her sponsors as well as books by other authors who had some connection with the city of Trieste, as well as translated works, with people from the Trieste area being responsible for the translations. A feature of the books she published was the considerable attention paid to their design and aesthetics.

Among the works published were some of her own. Although having started writing in the 1930s, she did not begin to publish until 1936 when two of her short stories appeared in the Venetian weekly Domani. She then contributed to various newspapers, such as La Fiera Letteraria, Il Piccolo, Il Gazzettino, and La Nazione. Her own works that she published included Le stagioni (The Seasons), a collection of prose poems containing her introspective and intimate reflections; Il Passeto (The Passage), a prose poem composed in the Trieste dialect, based on her family memories, particularly of her father; and La Casa Mia (My House), as well as the short story Passeggiata Armata (Armed Walk). Pittoni also inaugurated a literary salon at her home, which was attended by members of the Trieste intellectual class and others who occasionally visited the city. After the death of Stuparich, Pittoni dedicated the Centro di Studi Triestini, which she had founded, to him. This houses archives and historical and bibliographical sources, which provide a theoretical perspective of her work. Financial difficulties forced her to interrupt her publishing activity in 1971, but she continued to write for Il Piccolo.

== Death and legacy ==
Pittoni died at the La Maddalena hospital in Trieste on 8 May 1982. She was buried in the Cimitero Monumentale di Sant'Anna in Trieste.

Her diary from 1944 and 1945 was discovered by a bookseller from Trieste and published in 2020. In July 2025 the ITS Arcademy, a contemporary fashion museum based in Trieste, dedicated one of its exhibition spaces to her. The museum described this as an "act of cultural restitution to a woman who shaped the city's creative spirit in the 20th century."
