= Ognjen Jovanić =

Croatian chess grandmaster (born 1978)

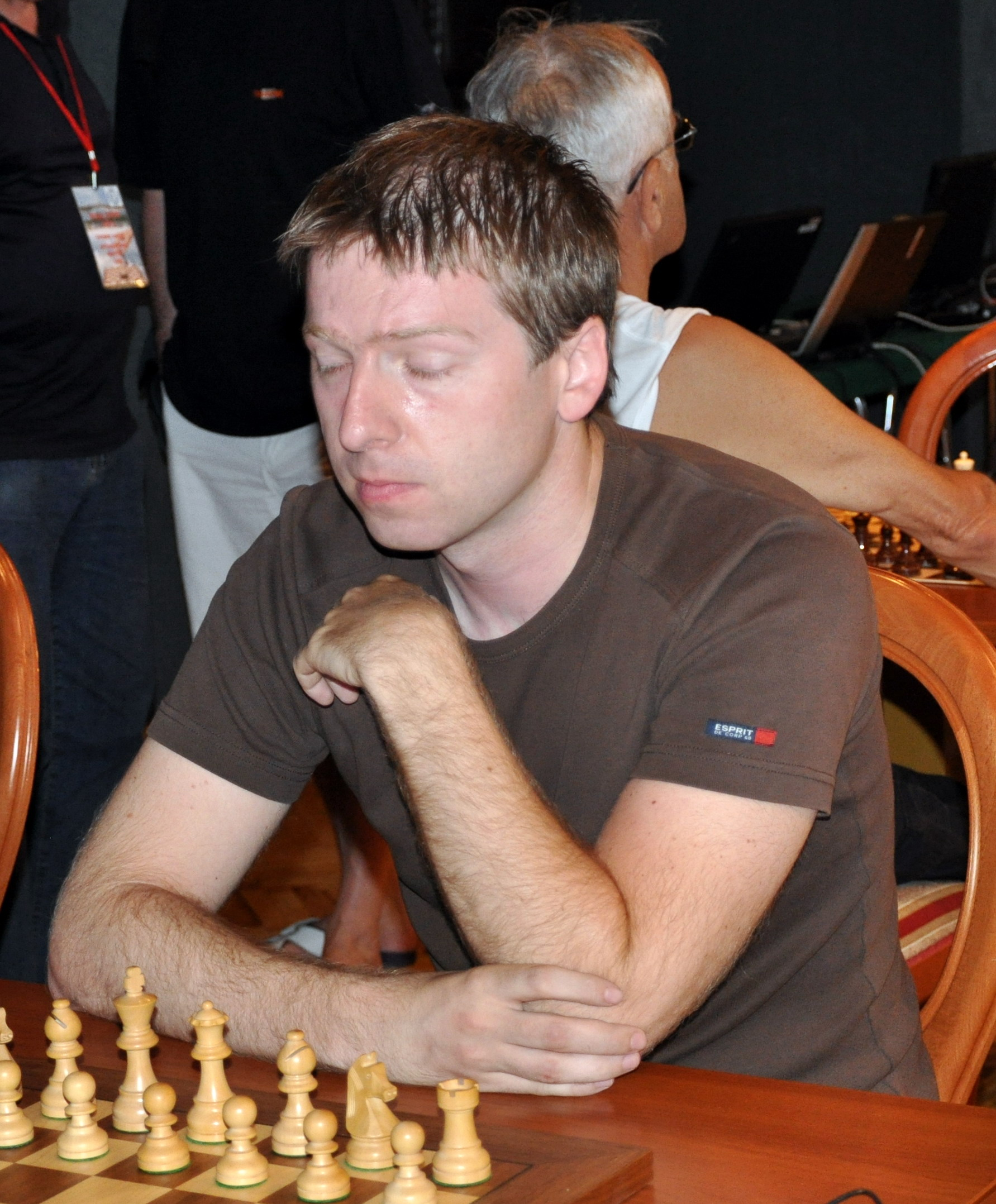

Personal information
- Born: 4 May 1978 (age 48) Šibenik, Yugoslavia, (now Šibenik, Croatia)

Chess career
- Country: Yugoslavia → Croatia
- Title: Grandmaster (2007)
- FIDE rating: 2492 (July 2026)
- Peak rating: 2552 (November 2009)

Ognjen Jovanić (born 4 May 1978) is a Croatian chess player and Grandmaster. He received the title in 2007, after achieving the title of International Master in 2002.

== Career ==
Jovanić has played in 3 Croatian Chess Championships. He placed eleventh in the Croatian Chess Championship 2005, eleventh in the Croatian Chess Championship 2011, and ninth in the Croatian Chess Championship 2017.
