= Wanda and Marion Wulz =

Italian experimental photographers

Wanda Wulz (born Vanda Wulz, 25 July 1903 – 16 April 1984) and Marion Wulz (born Maria Antonia Wulz, 25 March 1905 – 3 August 1993) were Italian photographers who worked together in Trieste, Italy. They were the last members of the Wulz family to operate its photographic studio, a business established by their grandfather Giuseppe Wulz in 1868 and subsequently managed by their father, Carlo Wulz. After their father's death the sisters took over the studio, continuing its commercial portraiture and documentary work while developing their own photographic interests.

The sisters' clients and associates included artists, actors, dancers and sportspeople. Wanda became known for her experimental photography and her association with Futurism, particularly her 1932 photomontage Io + gatto (Me + Cat). Marion worked in portraiture and documentary photography, and photographed events in Trieste during the Second World War. The sisters closed the studio in 1981, bringing to an end more than a century of photographic activity by the Wulz family.

== Family and early life ==
Wanda and Marion Wulz were born in Trieste (then part of the Austro-Hungarian Empire, now Italy), into a family of professional photographers. Their grandfather, Giuseppe Wulz (1843–1918), established the family photography business in 1868. Their father, Carlo Wulz (1874–1928), continued the business, producing portraits and photographs of the city and its inhabitants. Their mother, Angela Silla (1880–1923), was admitted to the psychiatric hospital at San Giovanni in Trieste in 1917. She returned home in 1919, described as "silent and invisible".

Wanda studied the piano, while Marion studied painting under Piero Lucano. Several of her landscapes and portraits are believed to have survived.

As he had no sons, Carlo trained his daughters in photography; their early involvement in the business included collaborating with their father in the conception and production of photographs, and serving as models for his photography.

== Photographic work ==
The family studio shot social events and created portraits, including those of fellow artists and local intellectuals. After Carlo's death in 1928 aged 53 (their mother had died five years earlier, aged 43), the sisters ran the studio, Studio Fotografico Wulz. They continued its established activities producing portraits, and photographs of Trieste and factories and construction sites commissioned by industrial and commercial clients.

Wanda appears to have taken the leading role in managing the studio. Marion also produced photographs for the studio, especially exterior photography and reportage. She was particularly skilled in retouching and printing, and was involved in the production of finished prints. She later recalled having strained her eyes through more than fifty years of retouching photographs.

Although in most cases the studio and experimental photographs are uniquely attributed to Wanda, it is often difficult to disentangle the authorial attributions or multiple roles of the Wulz sisters, especially as they shared a single camera.

The studio attracted a circle of artists and other figures from Trieste's cultural life. Among their friends, clients and associates were artists such as Leonor Fini, actors and dancers including Paola Borboni and Alba Wiegele), athletes such as Olympic champion fencer Irene Camber, and figures from the fashion world, including designer Anita Pittoni.

In the late 1920s, Wanda became interested in the "photodynamism" approach of the brothers Anton Giulio and Arturo Bragaglia, and Anton's manifesto Fotodinamismo futurista. Their explorations involved long sessions in the darkroom, resulting in photomontages, photoplastic works, and photodynamic images.

== Wanda Wulz ==
Wanda developed an interest in experimental portrait photography, often collaborating on work with her sister. She exhibited at the National Photographic Competition in Rome in 1930, the First International Photographic Exhibition at the XII International Fair in Milan in 1931, and at the 1932 Exhibition of the Fascist Revolution in Rome.

In 1932, Wanda became involved with Futurism following a meeting with Filippo Tommaso Marinetti, the leader of the movement. She took part in the Futurist Photographic Exhibition held in Trieste that year, organised by the poet Bruno Giordano Sanzin, where she presented works including Io + gatto, Wunder-bar, Jazz-band, Colazione futurista, and Esercizio.

Wanda's interest in Futurism developed during the 1930s, and she explored photographic techniques involving superimposition and the representation of movement. Her best-known photograph, Io + gatto, superimposes Wanda's face onto that of a cat. The photograph became one of the best-known examples of Italian Futurist photography and was subsequently reproduced and exhibited internationally. The Trieste newspaper [[Il Piccolo|Il Piccolo della sera]] praised her work, commenting, "Wanda Wulz stands out for her great elegance and the refined taste shown in both her concepts and her presentation: "Colazione" is one of the finest black-and-white still lifes to be seen in the exhibition; the image of beautiful, dancing legs is a truly delicate motif, and the superimposition of a woman and a cat can be called an unqualified success."

Her experimental period was relatively brief, and she moved away from the movement toward the end of the 1930s. She subsequently concentrated more extensively on commercial work at the family studio, and also photographed fashion, including designs by Anita Pittoni. She continued working as a photographer into later life.

== Marion Wulz ==
Marion was also trained in the family studio and worked as a photographer alongside her sister. Although less widely known than Wanda for avant-garde photography, she contributed to the studio's portraiture and documentary production. Her photographs included portraits of artists and other figures in Trieste's cultural life. In a 1989 interview, she said, "I knew Wanda was the talented one" ("sapevo che Wanda era più brava").

Inclined more towards reportage than her sister, Marion's work included documentary photography of the final months of the Second World War in Trieste. Between 1 May and 12 June 1945, she photographed the changing military and political situation in the city, including Yugoslav partisans, tanks, a burning German military vehicle, and New Zealand and other Allied troops, followed by demonstrations marking the end of the 40-day Yugoslav occupation. She worked both in the streets and from the terrace and windows of the Wulz residence and studio in central Trieste.

The Wulz archive contains a substantial body of Marion's work, and the Fondazione Alinari identifies her photographic works as important wartime documentary records. Her photographs from this period have subsequently been included in exhibitions devoted to the sisters' work and the history of Trieste.

== Later life ==
Wanda and Marion Wulz closed their studio in 1981 amid financial difficulties, bringing to an end more than a century of photographic activity by the Wulz family. Wanda died on 16 April 1984 in Trieste. Marion continued to document their shared life and work in diaries, and collaborated with Marta Cobez in organising and preserving the family photographic archive. Marion died on 3 August 1993, also in Trieste.

== Legacy ==
Between 1986 and 2007, the Fratelli Alinari photographic firm acquired a large number of items from the Wulz photography studio, including glass-plate negatives, film negatives, vintage prints, photographic equipment, documents, invoices, letters, accounts, and diary entries, recording the work of three generations of the family from the nineteenth century to the twentieth. The Wulz archive is now preserved in the Alinari Archives, which became public property following their acquisition by the Tuscany Region in 2019. The Fondazione Alinari per la Fotografia was established, and subsequently undertook a project to preserve the material including the reorganisation, conservation, digitisation and cataloguing of more than 5,000 of the sisters' photographic negatives, making the material available for research and consultation. Photographs by Wanda, Marion, and other members of the Wulz family have been made available through the Foundation's online archive. The project has also reassessed the attribution of individual photographs, and examination of negatives alongside vintage prints has enabled researchers to correct some previous attributions between Wanda and Marion.

In 2014, a park in Trieste, accessible from Via Catullo, 5, was named after Wanda and Marion Wulz.

== Reception ==
Wanda's experimental and conceptual photography, particularly Io + gatto, brought her recognition as a participant in the Italian Futurist movement, and the photograph became one of her best-known works. In her study of the Wulz family archive, Silvia Valisa argues that Io + gatto does more than demonstrate technical virtuosity: its combination of woman and animal challenges conventional distinctions between the photographer, the subject and the image. She also interprets it as an intervention in a visual tradition in which women had generally been represented by others, rather than controlling their own representation.

The Wulz archive is a source for the photographic and social history of Trieste. It includes studio portraits, commercial commissions and documentary photographs, among them Marion's records of the city during the final months of the Second World War. The Fondazione Alinari has described the Wulz archive as an important resource for the history of photography and Italian social history. The curators of the 2026 exhibition at the Estorick Collection described the studio as a "vibrant centre of artistic and commercial production" in Trieste and emphasised the sisters' role in the city's cultural life.

The sisters' work has also been considered in relation to women's changing position in artistic and cultural life. The curators of the 2024–2025 exhibition at the Magazzino delle Idee presented the photographs as a means of examining changes in women's identity and the movement towards independence during the early twentieth century.

== Selected works ==
Valisa points out that many photographs were labelled retrospectively by Marion after Wanda's death, and that individual attribution within the archive is not always straightforward. The sisters sometimes collaborated on negatives and prints.

=== Wanda Wulz ===
- Wunder-bar (c. 1930)
- Three Gymnasts from Etta Paulin's Acrobatics School Perform Gymnastic Exercises (Tre ginnaste della Scuola di Acrobatica di Etta Paulin eseguono esercizi ginnici, 1931)
- Jazz Band (1931)
- Futurist Breakfast (Colazione futurista, 1932)
- Exercise (Esercizio, 1932)
- Io + gatto (1932)

=== Marion Wulz ===
- Portrait of Wanda Wulz in Egyptian Costume a.k.a. Wanda Dressed as Salome (Ritratto di Wanda Wulz (1903-1984) con abito da egiziana, c. 1930)
- Portrait of Wanda Wulz (1903-1984) in Motorcyclist's Gear (Ritratto di Wanda Wulz (1903-1984) in tenuta da motociclista, c. 1930-1932)
- The Ballet Dancer Alba Wiegele Shown Dancing (La ballerina Alba Wiegele ritratta mentre esegue una figura coreografica, c. 1940)
- Photographs of Trieste in Last Months of War
- Portrait of Wanda Wulz in the Mirror (Ritratto di Wanda Wulz allo specchio, c. 1950)
- "In guardia". The Fencer Irene Camber ("In guardia". La schermitrice Irene Camber, 1952)

== Exhibitions ==
=== Selected exhibitions featuring works by Wanda Wulz ===
- 1930: National Photographic Competition (Biennale Internazional d'Arte Fotografica di Roma), Rome
- 1931: International Photographic Exhibition (Prima Mostra fotografica internazionale) at the XII International Fair, Milan
- 1932: Exhibition of the Fascist Revolution (Mostra della Rivoluzione Fascista) at the Palazzo delle Esposizioni, Rome
- 1932: Futurist Photographic Exhibition of Trieste (Mostra fotografica futurista di Trieste), Trieste
- 2004–2005: Seen from Italy, 1841–1941: Italian Photography in the Collections of the Alinari Museum (Vu d'Italie, 1841–1941: La photographie italienne dans les collections du Musée Alinari), Pavillon des Arts, Paris
- 2006: Seen from Italy, 1841–1941 (Vu d'Italie, 1841–1941), Fratelli Alinari Fondazione per la Storia della Fotografia, Florence
- 2006–2007: Their Eyes Give Them Away (Sus ojos les delatan), Fundació Foto Colectania, Barcelona
- 2008: Female Trouble: The Camera as Mirror and Stage for Female Self-Presentation (Female Trouble: Die Kamera als Spiegel und Bühne weiblicher Inszenierungen, Pinakothek der Moderne, Munich
- 2011–2012: Sight of Italy, 1841-1941: Great Masters of Italian Photography in Alinari Museum Collections, Rosphoto State Museum and Exhibition Centre for Photography, Saint Petersburg
- 2012–2013: Faking It: Manipulated Photography Before Photoshop, Metropolitan Museum of Art, New York
- 2014–2015: Lola Garrido Collection: A Portable History of Photography, Pushkin State Museum of Fine Arts, Moscow
- 2021–2022: Masterworks of Modern Photography (MoMA), The Thomas Walther Collection, Jeu de Paume, Paris
- 2026: Animal Model: 200 Years of Photography (Modèle animal: 200 ans de photographie), Rencontres d'Arles, Arles
- 2026–2027: Animal Model: 200 Years of Photography (Modèle animal: 200 ans de photographie), Photo Élysée, Lausanne

=== Exhibitions by Wanda and Marion Wulz and family ===
- 1986: Faces, Landscapes (Visages, paysages), Eiffel Tower, Paris
- 1989: The Trieste of the Wulz family: Faces of a History. Photographs 1860–1980 (La Trieste dei Wulz : volti di una storia. Fotografie 1860-1980), Palazzo Costanzi, Trieste
- 2024–2025: Fotografia Wulz : Trieste, la famiglia, l'atelier (Wulz Photography: Trieste, the family, the studio), Magazzino delle Idee, Trieste, presented almost 300 photographs, negatives, documents and objects from the family archive, exploring the relationship between the family's photographic work and the social and cultural history of the city.
- 2026: Wanda and Marion Wulz: Avant-garde Photography in 20th-Century Italy, Estorick Collection of Modern Italian Art in London, presented photographs by the sisters, their father and grandfather, and examined the sisters' photographic practice, their role in the cultural life of Trieste and the wider history of the Wulz family studio. This exhibition gave both sisters prominence, rather than presenting Marion simply as Wanda's collaborator.

== Sources ==
- I Wulz: tre generazioni di fotografi a Trieste dal 1868 al 1981 [The Wulz family: three generations of photographers in Trieste from 1868 to 1981] (in Italian). Trieste: Comune di Trieste. 1981.
- Bentivoglio, Mirella; Zoccoli, Franca (2008). Le futuriste italiane nelle arti visive [Italian Futurist Women in the Visual Arts] (in Italian). De Luca. ISBN 978-88-8016-795-2.
- Cartagine, Paolo (December 2024). "I Wulz di nuovo a Trieste" [The Wulz Family Back in Trieste] (PDF). Il Ponte Rosso (in Italian). No. 110. pp. 45–47.
- Chernick, Karen (15 September 2026). "Estorick Collection celebrates trailblazing avant-garde photography duo from Trieste". The Art Newspaper.
- Circarq (11 March 2020). "Wanda Wulz (1903-1984)". Circarq (in Spanish).
- Curci, Roberto (December 2024). "Marion, ultima e infaticabile" [Marion, the Last and Tireless One] (PDF). Il Ponte Rosso (in Italian). No. 110.
- De Rosa, Diana (2025). Scatti di follia [Snapshots of Madness] (in Italian). Trieste: Comunicarte. ISBN 978-8862871167.
- Falcone, Linda; Di Rocco, Eugenia (Winter 2023). "'5,000 NEGATIVES': A deeper dive Safeguarding the Wulz sisters' legacy at FAF". Restorations Conversations. No. 4.
- Estorick Catalogue (2026). Wanda and Marion Wulz: Avant-garde Photography in 20th-Century Italy. Estorick Collection.
- Estorick Collection (2026). "Wanda and Marion Wulz: Avant-garde Photography in 20th-Century Italy". Estorick Collection. Estorick Collection of Modern Italian Art.
- Guagnini, Elvio; Zannier, Italo (1989). La Trieste dei Wulz: volti di una storia : fotografie 1860-1980 [The Trieste of the Wulz family: faces of a history – photographs 1860–1980] (in Italian). Fratelli Alinari spa. ISBN 978-88-7292-112-8.
- Lista, Giovanni (2001). Futurism & Photography. Merrell. ISBN 978-1-85894-125-7.
- Mezzena Lona, Alessandro (12 March 2025). "Trieste: lo sguardo dei Wulz" [Trieste: the gaze of the Wulz]. Doppiozero (in Italian).
- Moorhead, Joanna (25 August 2026). "The cat that fought Mussolini: how the Wulz photography sisters weaponised the family pet". The Guardian.
- Muzzarelli, Federica (2024). "Wanda e Marion Wulz. Fotografe e sorelle [Wanda and Marion Wulz. Photographers and sisters]". In Giusa, Antonio; Muzzarelli, Federica (eds.). Fotografia Wulz : Trieste, la famiglia, l'atelier [Wulz Photography: Trieste, the family, the studio] (in Italian and English). Milan: Silvana. pp. 148–168. ISBN 978-8836659845.
- Sesti, Emanuela; Guadagnini, Walter (2022). Fotografe! Dagli archivi Alinari a oggi [Women Photographers! From the Alinari Archives to the Present Day] (in Italian and English). Florence: Mandragora. ISBN 978-8874615896.
- Valisa, Silvia (2013). "An Imaged Life. Wanda Wulz and the Familiar Archive". In Riccobono, Rossella M. (ed.). A Window on the Italian Female Modernist Subjectivity: From Neera to Laura Curino (PDF). Newcastle: Cambridge Scholars Publishing. pp. 45–77. ISBN 978-1-4438-4983-8.
- Wasowski, Richard (2002). "Wulz, Wanda (1903–1984)". In Commire, Anne (ed.). Women in World History: A Biographical Encyclopedia. Waterford, Connecticut: Yorkin Publications. ISBN 0-7876-4074-3. Archived from the original on 20 February 2016.
- Ziani, Gabriella (9 December 2025). "Angela Wulz, matta per dolore" [Angela Wulz, Driven Mad by Pain]. Il Ponte Rosso (in Italian). No. 120.
