= Gabriele De Nuzzo =

Italian footballer

Personal information
- Date of birth: 12 September 1999 (age 27)
- Place of birth: Trieste, Italy
- Height: 1.83 m (6 ft 0 in)
- Position: Midfielder

Youth career
- –2018: Udinese

Senior career*
Years	Team	Apps	(Gls)
2018	→ Como (loan)	11	(0)
2018–2021	Como	53	(2)
2021–2022	Vis Pesaro	14	(0)
2022–2023	Fermana	26	(0)

International career^{‡}
2014	Italy U15	2	(0)
2014	Italy U16	1	(0)
- * Club domestic league appearances and goals as of 23 April 2023 ‡ National team caps and goals as of 10 December 2014

Gabriele De Nuzzo (born 12 September 1999) is an Italian footballer who plays as a midfielder.

== Club career ==
=== Como ===
In July 2019, De Nuzzo signed a two-year contract extension with the club.

=== Vis Pesaro ===
On 11 July 2021, he signed a two-year contract with Vis Pesaro.

=== Fermana ===
On 19 August 2022, De Nuzzo joined Fermana on a one-year contract.

== International career ==
De Nuzzo was a young international for Italy.
