= Franca Batich =

Italian contemporary artist

- Born: 19 January 1940 (age 86); Trieste
- Known for: Painting
- Movement: Abstract art

Franca Batich (born 19 January 1940, in Trieste, Italy) is an Italian contemporary artist who specializes in oil and mixed technique abstract painting.

A student of Giovanni Giordani, Frida de Reya, and Alice Psaconopulo, Batich first began exhibiting her artwork in the 1960s. She has contributed to several collective shows in Italy as well as internationally in New York, Salzburg, Udine and Dalmatia. She has, since 1993, devoted herself to the development of formal and existential content, the common thread that is the basis of her artistic search. She represents the capture of a moment in space and time that is projected in an abstract dimension. With wide brushstrokes and dense colour, she creates unreal places and uses both bright and more sober shades to, depending on their density, reproduce movement or fixed contemplation. In this special world, the artist has recently introduced "theatres"—scenes populated by "emancipated puppets" assembled in chaotic balance whose strings maintain their geometric autonomy.

Her works have been associated with and inspired poems by such Italian major poets as Eugenio Montale, and Umberto Saba (who was born in Trieste like Batich). According to art critic Marianna Accerboni, Batich is "one of the most important artists in the second half of the Twentieth Century in Trieste, as she was able to interpret an epoch's drive, problems, and emotions with delicate intensity, an unexceptionable technique and refined originality". Barbara Romani has written that "Her abstract naturalism does not aim to represent the outer world but only the inner world, through shapes, lines and colours. The big spaces thick with colour are crossed by intersecting lines, leading to a focal point which stands beyond the canvas, elsewhere. These thin threads get lost in the distance, but at the same time they are able to reproduce the feeling of the horizon. Claudio Magris names rosso Batich the shade of red used by the artist, a characteristic colour which makes her works recognizable.

== Selected exhibitions ==
- 1993 - Inseguire il Vento - Sala Comunale d'Arte - Trieste
- 1997 - Il circo e le sue metamorfosi - AIAT - Trieste
- 1998 - Dietro le Quinte - Galleria Grandangolo - Trieste
- 1998 - Linea d'Orizzonte - Galleria Piccardi - Trieste
- 1999 - Qui e Altrove - Circ. Assicurazioni Generali - Trieste
- 2005 - Occidente - Biblioteca Statale - Trieste
- 2007 - E fu sera e fu mattina - Biblioteca Statale - Gorizia
- 2009 - Prospettive sul filo dell'immaginario - Galleria Giudecca 795 - Venice

== Bibliography ==
- Franca Batich, Inseguendo il Vento (Chasing the Wind), Franco Rosso Editore, Trieste 2008; preface by Claudio Magris: the book collects several critical texts and images from her main solo shows since 1993.
- Cataloghi mostre a Palazzo Marenzi, Sindacato Artisti Pittori Scultori Incisori, Trieste
- Claudio H. Martelli, Dizionario degli Artisti di Trieste, dell’Isontino, dell’Istria e Dalmazia, Hammerle Editori di Trieste, 1996
- Excerpta – Artisti del Friuli Venezia Giulia, 2004
- Arte Triveneta 2000, Ediz. Piva – Padua (Regione Veneto)
- Cataloghi del Centro Friulano Arti Plastiche di Udine
- DARS – Parole e Silenzi – Mostra censimento indagine artiste Friuli Venezia Giulia – edito dal Centro Arti Plastiche Udine
- Enzo Santese, Cento e più opere nella prospettiva di un museo, Biblioteca Cominiana, 1994
- Catalogo In-Coerenze creative – Artisti a Trieste Oggi - Comune di Trieste – Assessorato alla Cultura, 1996 – Museo Revoltella
- Contemporary Artists from Trieste – with photos and critic reviews for the show at Istituto Italiano Di Cultura New York City, 1989
- Catalogo Internazionale Art Nurnberg 1989
- Arte Italiana Contemporanea - Veneto/Friuli Venezia Giulia - Ediz. La Ginestra Florence, 1989
- BI.D.Art. 88 Bergamo Ediz. Alexia
- Interart Salzburg – International Messefur moderne Kunst – Salzburg, 1985
