= Eugenio Scomparini =

Italian painter (1845–1913)

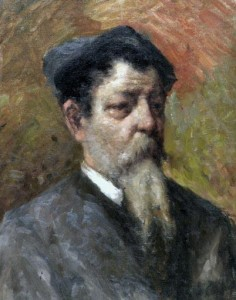
Self-portrait (date unknown)

Eugenio Scomparini (1 September 1845 – 17 March 1913) was an Italian painter.

He was born in Trieste, and initially took lessons there from the engraver Giovanni Moscotto at the School of Design. His mother, Maria Scomparini, had heralded from Venice. He moved with his friend Antonio Lonza to Venice. In 1863, using a stipend from the city of Trieste, he enrolled at the Accademia of Venice, where he trained with Michelangelo Grigoletti and Pompeo Molmenti. In 1873, he was nominated to the Arts council of the Museo Revoltella, which gave advice on the curation at the Museum.

In 1874–77, Scomparini traveled to Rome. He taught from 1887 to 1911 at the industrial School of Trieste. he painted decorations for the Theaters of Trieste, Split, Gorizia, and Treviso, among others. and for the palazzo Artelli in Trieste. His style recalls Mariano Fortuny and Hans Makart. Some his works can be seen in the Revoltella Civic Museum of Trieste.

Among his pupils were Bruno Croatto, Ugo Flumiani, Piero Lucano, Ruggero Rovan, Marcello Dudovich, Piero Marussig, Argio Orell, Vito Timmel, Vittorio Bergagna, and Gino Parin.

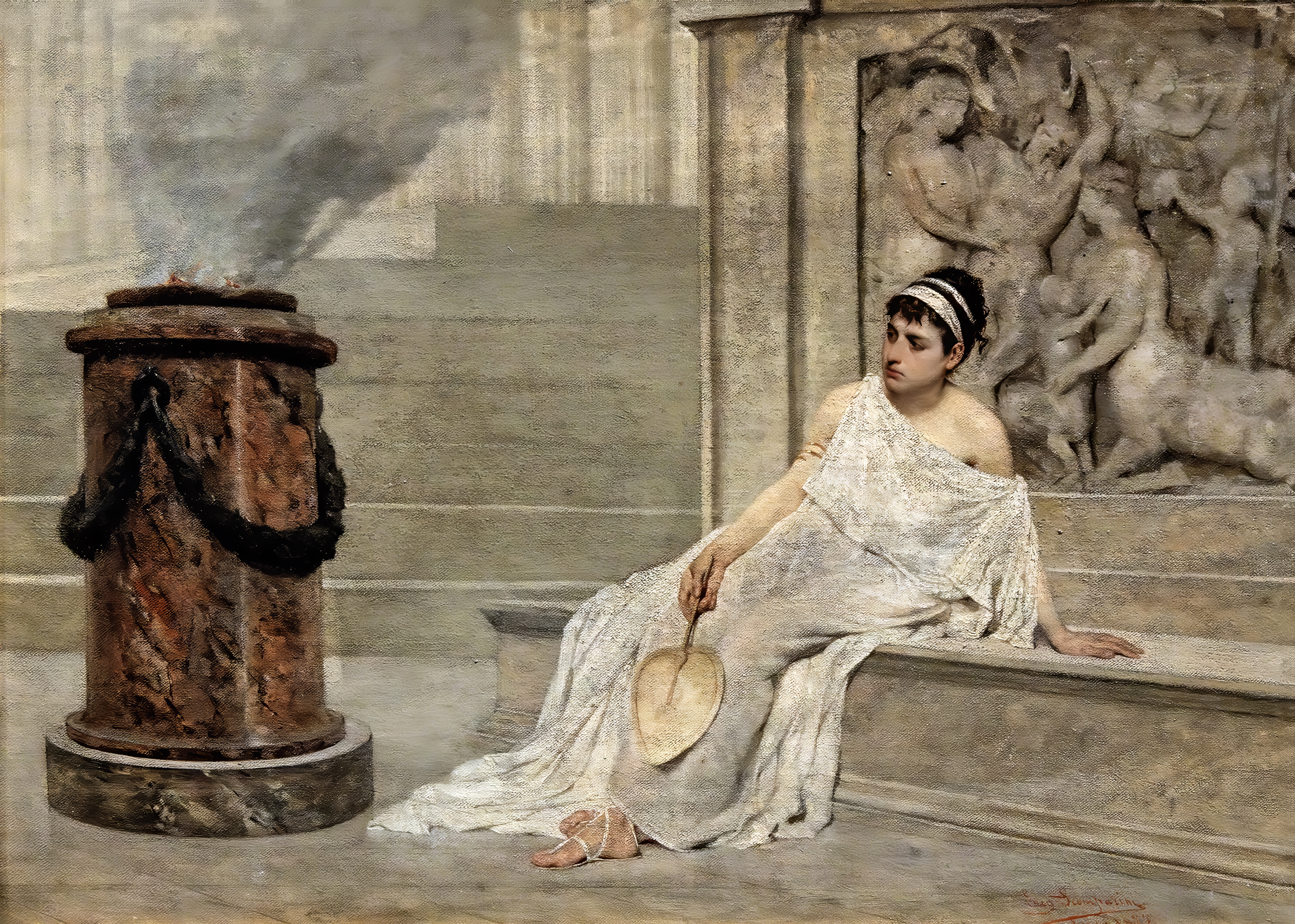
The ancient vestal, 1877

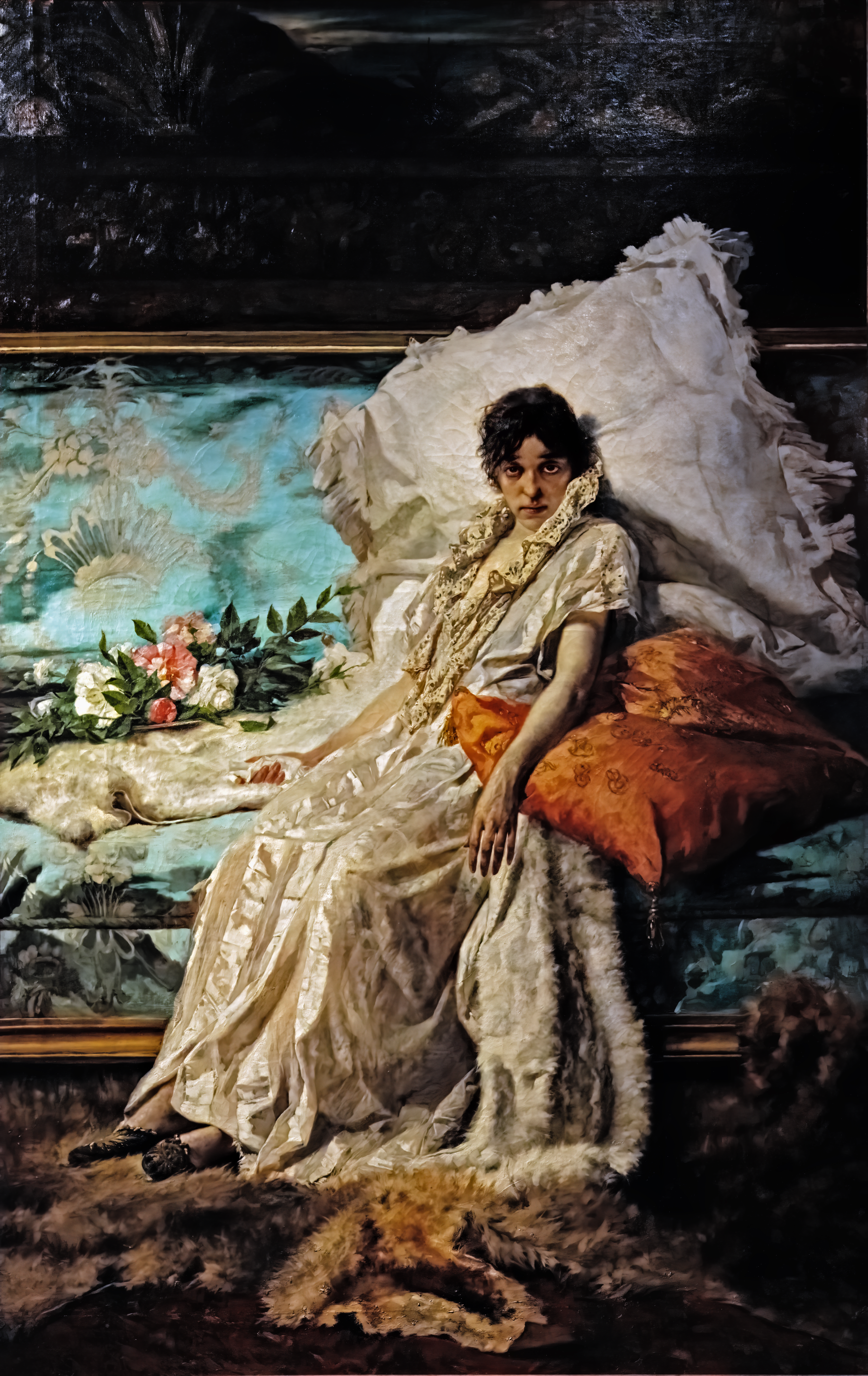
Portrait of Marguerite Gauthier, 1890

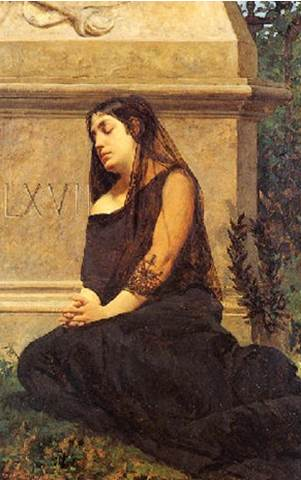
In Prayer
