= Argio Orell =

Italian painter and engraver (1884 - 1942)

- Born: 17 September 1884; Trieste, Austria-Hungary
- Died: 10 January 1942 (aged 57); Trieste, Italy
- Education: Academy of Fine Arts, Munich
- Known for: Painting, graphic arts, engraving
- Movement: Vienna Secession; Japonisme

Argio Orell (17 September 1884 – 10 January 1942) was an Italian painter and engraver. He was one of the most sought-after Italian portraitists in the 1920s and 1930s.

== Biography ==
He was born in Trieste on 17 September 1884, the son of Giuseppe and Calliope Iconomo. Orell trained with Eugenio Scomparini at the Scuola Industriale in Trieste. Later, he enrolled at the Academy of Fine Arts in Munich, where he studied under Franz von Stuck. He was admitted to the course even though he was seventeen and technically not allowed to do so, wanted by von Stuck, who appreciated his first works. He was influenced by van Stuck who took him under his wing, and at the end of the course was awarded the prize for the best work by a foreign student.

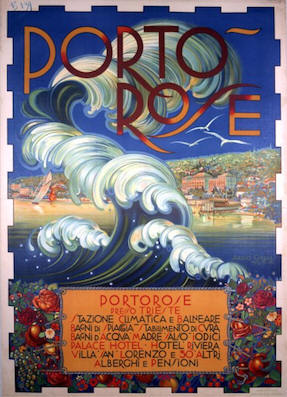
Portorose manifesto, 1920

Returned to Trieste, he had successful expositions there, and started "a production both of posters and paintings that extended his fame well above the local boundaries [of Trieste]." After successful expositions in Rome and Bergamo, with the King of Italy among his estimators and clients, he became, in the 1920s and 1930s, one of the most sought-after Italian portraitists. In 1906 he painted the windows of Trieste's Palazzo Modello in Piazza Grande, which hosted exhibitions, together with Vito Timmel.

During the First World War he was recruited by the Austrian army, and sent to Radkersburg, together with several prominent artists and intellectuals, including his friend and fellow painter Vito Timmel. During the time spent there, he painted mural paintings (now lost) for the club Bohem together with Timmel.

Orell was a painter and a commercial artist, publishing posters for several companies. Some fifteen posters were found, some inspired by Leonetto Cappiello, others, such as "Pelliccerie Cohen," by Marcello Dudovich.

He was an appreciator of Japanese culture. He probably first came into contact with Japonisme during his stay in Munich. Orell approached Japanese art by reading journals and books on Ukiyo-e and studying specific Japanese woodcuts, and at the same time started collecting Ukiyo-e, going on to own a precious collection. In 1910 he painted the poster for the Fair of Capodistria, in which he "combined that Japonisme that came for the passion for Hokusai to the dictates of Secessionism, interpreting them in his own way, offering very elegant solutions." In 1912 he was the curator of an exposition of Oriental art in Trieste.

He died in Trieste on 10 January 1942.

== Gallery ==
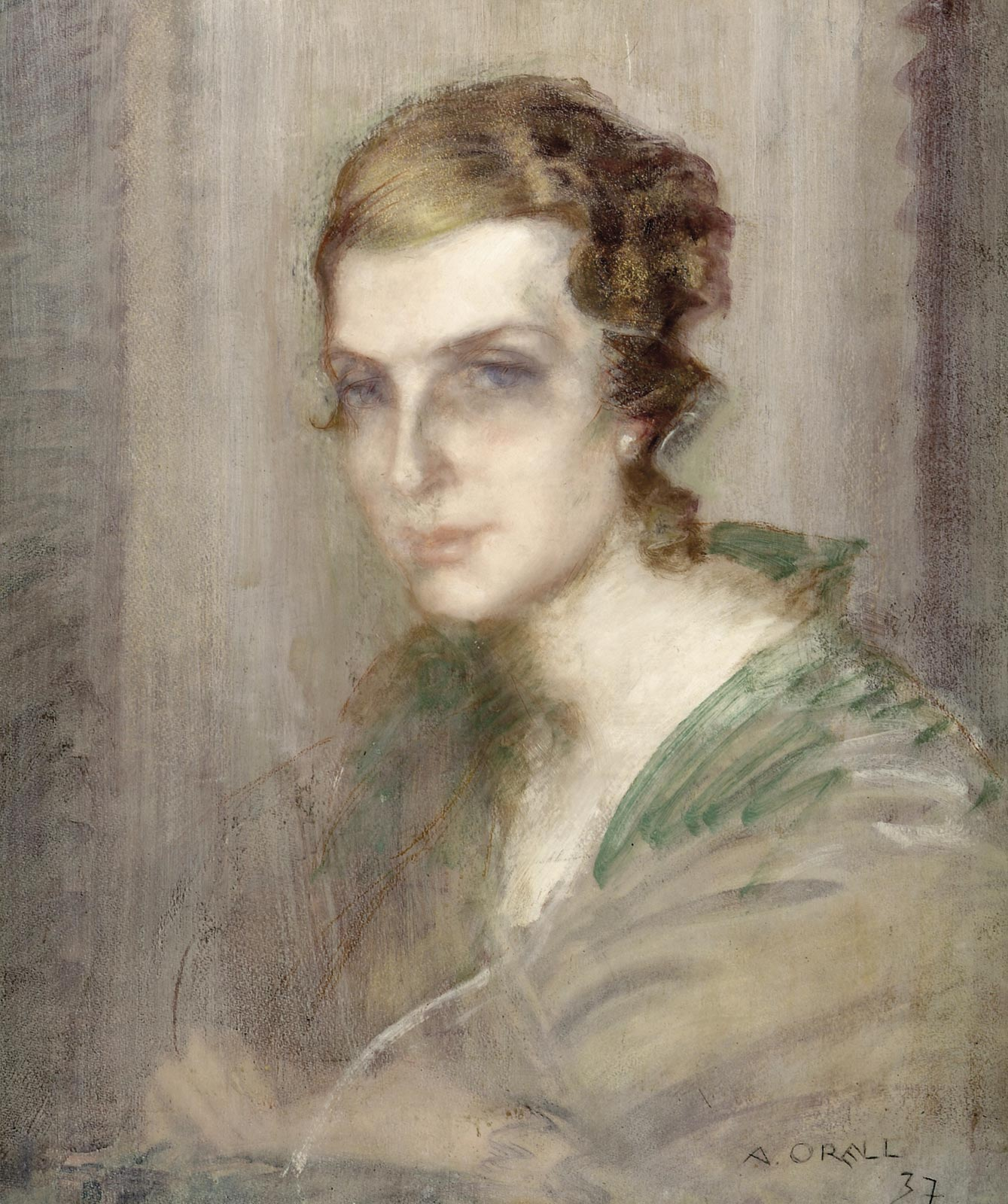
Ritratto femminile, oil on panel

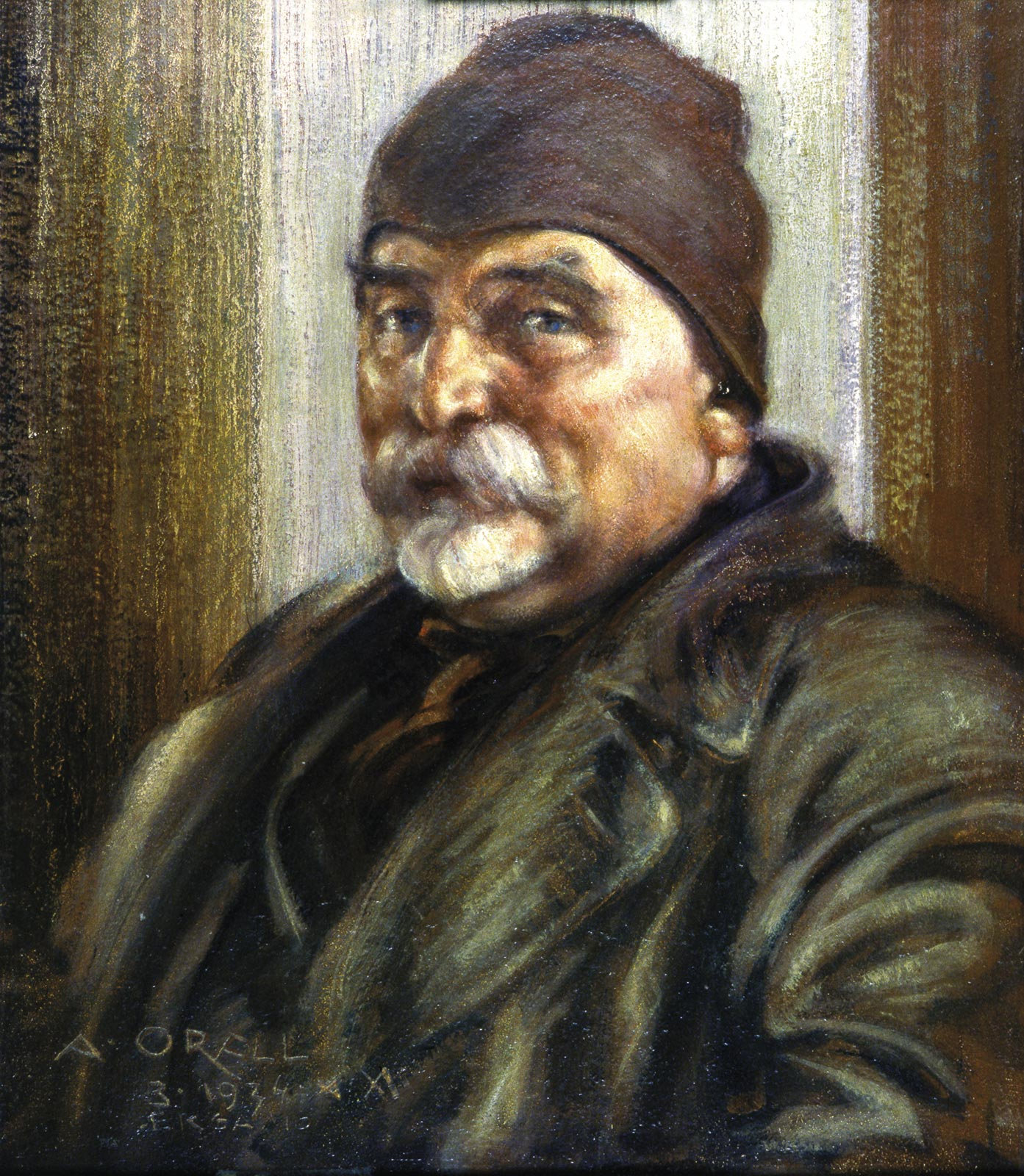
Il Navarca, oil on panel

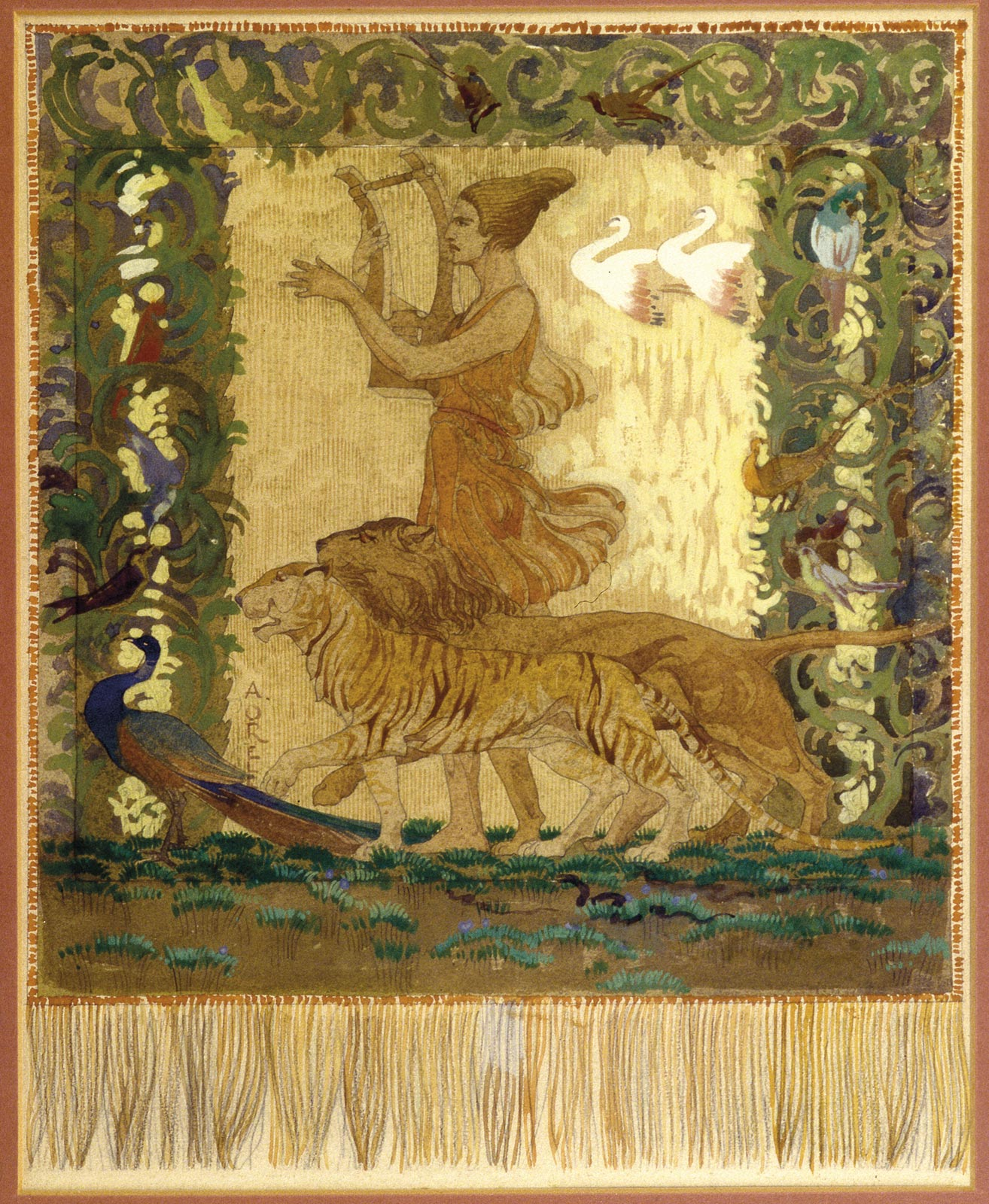
Allegory, pastel and watercolor on cardboard

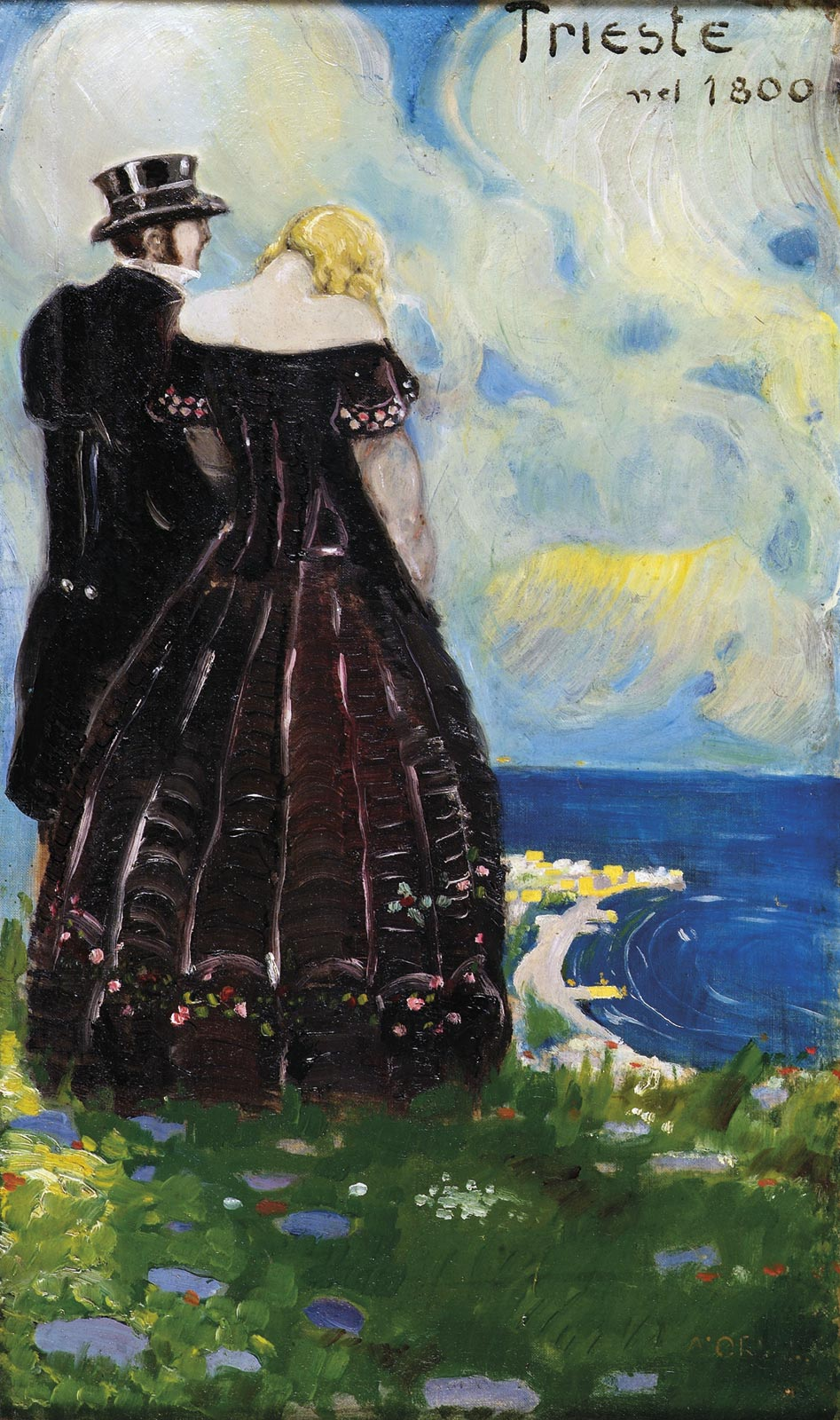
Trieste in the 19th Century, oil on panel

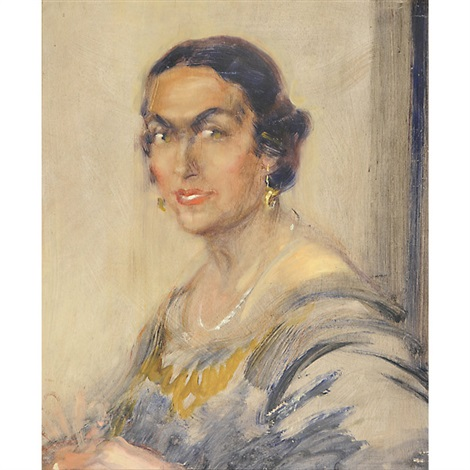
Giovane donna con orecchini, oil on plywood

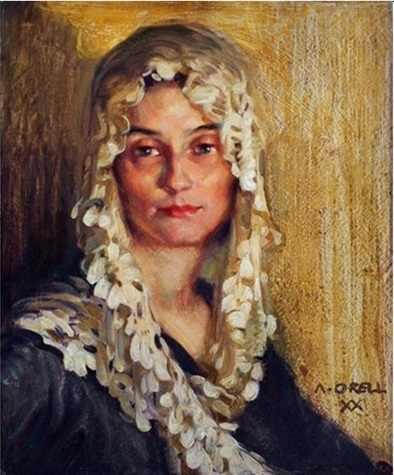
Portrait of a Woman

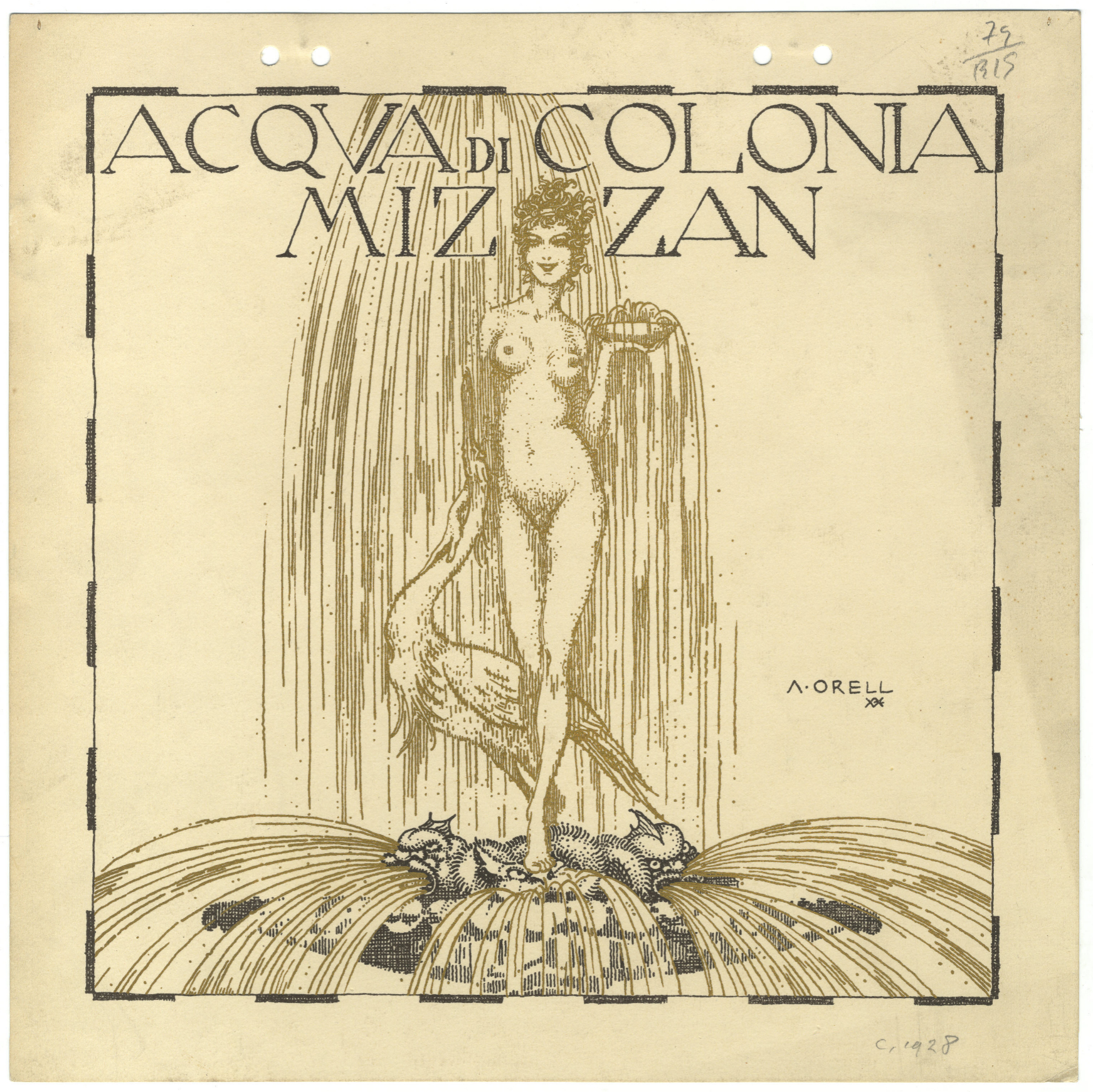
Acqua Colonia Mizzan, poster

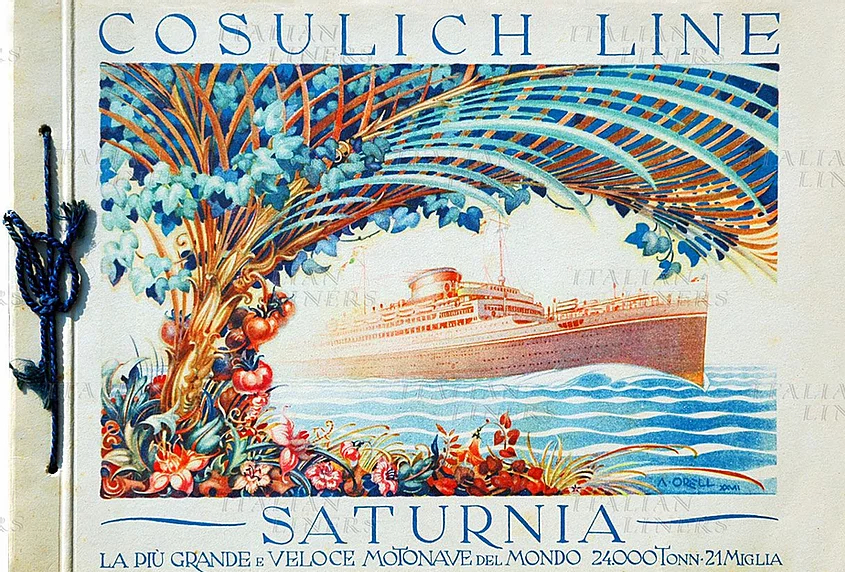
Pre-maiden voyage introductory brochure for the Saturnia
