= Antonio Valdoni =

Italian painter (1834–1890)

Antonio Valdoni (Trieste, 1834 - Milan, 1890) was an Italian painter, mainly of Alpine and Lombard landscapes.

Active in the wars of independence as a partisan of Garibaldi, Valdoni moved to Milan in 1866. He studied painting at the University in Padua. Among his works: Prima della pioggia; L'Adda nei surroundings of Lecco; Sul lago d' Olginate; A Pescate near Lecco; Faggi; and Stagno. He exhibited in Milan and Naples the following works: Colpo di vento; Marina; Barche dell'Adriatico; A Nervi; Riviera di Genoa; In porto; Il Ticino a Sesto Calende; and Boscaglia.
