= Mihajlo Vučetić =

Serbian merchant, shipowner and insurer

Mihajlo Vučetić (Serbian Cyrillic: Михајло Вучетић; c. 1790 – 1882) was a Serbian grain merchant, shipowner and shareholder in Austrian Lloyd.

== Background ==
Trieste and Venice were of great significance for the cultural history of the Serbs at the turn of the 18th to the 19th century. A wealthy and well‐organised Serbian community operated in Trieste, producing the biggest names in Serbian culture and more than a dozen successful merchants, shipowners, bankers and philanthropists.

The first prominent Trieste representative of the Vučetić family was Mihajlo Vučetić who emigrated to Austria from Venetian Boka Kotorska.

== Family life ==
Vučetić married Ana Riznić, daughter of Stefan Riznić. They had five children: Katerina, Eliza, Stefan, Djordje and Jovan. Mihajlo Vučetić received a patent of nobility from Bishop Petar II Petrović-Njegoš, and the title "noble of Grbalj, like his brother Archimandrite Stefan (Vučetić) of Grblja.

== Career ==
By Imperial decree on 31 December 1814, Mihajlo Vučetić's wholesale trading company was established. Since then, it only flourished. In 1871 Vučetić founded the shipping company Adria in Trieste. The company had three steamships and started working successfully for seven years until his shipping business branched out into the insurance sector. He became a shareholder in Austrian Lloyd in 1878 and was the head of the Monte Civico Commerciale bank.

== Death ==
Vučetić died in Trieste.
