= Colori =

1941 poetry collection by Virgilio Giotti

- First-edition cover
- Author: Virgilio Giotti
- Language: Triestine dialect; Italian
- Genre: Poetry
- Publisher: Parenti
- Publication date: 1941
- Publication place: Italy

Colori (lit. '"Colours"') is a collection of poems by Italian poet Virgilio Giotti published in Florence in 1941. The poems are in the Triestine dialect, and were composed in the 1930s. The work features some of Giotti's most intense poems.

== Overview ==
The poems contained in the 1941 collection were composed by Giotti, the other great Triestine poet alongside Saba, in the first half of the 1930s. Among them are some of his most intense poems: "from Con Bolàffio to the Album de primavera section. The section La morte is also very important, with the presentiments that emerge in El pergoleto and La casa." This book of poetry "is also the novel of a city and a family, where over the years Giotti adds dream and fantasy characters to the real ones, creating a sort of Spoon River of memory."

In 1943, a collection of poems, also titled Colori, was published in Diego Valeri's series L'Arcobaleno by the publishing house Le Tre Venezie. This collection included all of Giotti's poems, together with some unpublished ones, including El paradiso, fundamental in that it is "representative of what Claudio Magris, together with Biagio Marin, defined as the «sanctity» of Giotti's familiar affections."
