= Ruggero Rovan =

Italian sculptor (1877–1965)

- Self-portrait, 1896
- Born: 1877; Trieste, Austria
- Died: 3 November 1965 (aged 87–88); Trieste, Italy
- Education: Academy of Fine Arts, Munich
- Known for: Sculpture

Ruggero Rovan (1877 – 3 November 1965) was an Italian sculptor. Rovan created "naturalistic and often very emotional sculptures," and is considered one of the greatest 20th-century sculptors and artists from Trieste.

== Biography ==
Rovan was born in Trieste in 1877, into a poor family. He studied at the Scuola industriale in Trieste. He later studied with local sculptor Vittorio Güttner. One of the oldest preserved works of Rovan is the colored plaster cast bust of Arturo Fittke, signed and dated 1896 on the left shoulder. Among his early works are also My Cousin Linda (1896), as the tile suggests, a portrait of his cousin Linda, the bust Dionisio Romanelli (1897), and some self-portraits. In 1900, having fulfilled military service in Graz, he was at the Academy of Fine Arts in Munich. Among his works from the early 1900s are Il nemico, which won the Rittmeyer Prize in 1905 and was exposed at the Venice Biennale the same year, and La pensosa (1903). During the German period he produced a series of busts, including of children and youths, among which is Vittorio Güttner Junior. In 1906 he produced the plaster cast Fiore d'ombra.

In 1902 he won the Rittmeyer scholarship and went to study in Rome for three years. Among his works from the period in Rome is the Aurelio Arteta, presented in 1906 at the Milan International. He exposed at the Venice biennale in 1905, 1920, 1948, while in 1913 he had his first personal exhibition at the Permanente di Trieste. Since 1910, he participated in the most important exhibitions, and was noticed and discussed by the "highest national and foreign critics."

Among his works from the 1910s are the marbles Il sorriso (1910) and Bust of Alessandro Manussi (1910), and the plaster casts Natura (1910) and La madre (1913).

In the 1910s and 1920s, Rovan received some commissions for funerary monuments, completing the Tomb Huber (1914), the Tomb Simonetta (1925), and, following a project of Vito Timmel, the Tomb Mizzan (1925). He also produced the Monument Rossi Tenze de Mayer, whose cast model of the central part, called L'annegato and completed already in 1915, was the only sculpture exhibited at the 1922 Permanente di Trieste.

Il bacio, detail of the original, larger version, now lost

In the 1920s he produced his acclaimed Homo solus, which was admitted to the 1922 Venice biennale, but wasn't exposed because it was made of cast. It was exposed six years later at the county's exposition, where it was enthusiastically praised by Silvio Benco. The work is part of a cycle by the artist, preceded by In sé, created in the 1910s, and concluded with L'uomo stanco (1928). Homo solus is Rodinesque, and is particularly reminiscent of The Burghers of Calais, whose plaster cast had been exposed at the 1901 biennale. Rodinesque is also his acclaimed Il bacio (ca. 1900), whose original version is now lost.

Among his works from the 1920s is the plaster cast bust of his friend Italo Svevo, completed just one year before the demise of the writer, who died on 13 September 1928 in a car crash. Both he and Svevo were part of the circle of artists of the Caffè Garibaldi, whose works were often inspired by their dialogues, by each other's work and also by the friends artists themselves. Other members included Umberto Saba, who in 1921 dedicated his Canzoniere to his "six readers" Bazlen, Romanellis, Giotti, Schiffrer, Rovan and Bolaffio. Of this bust was said that it presents the "limpid and blunt line of the mature Rovan, that in this case well interprets the image of the writer, especially in his expression, which is hieratic and realistic." It is the only extant bust of Svevo from when the artist was still alive. Svevo much appreciated the work, and paid himself for the bronze casting, while Rovan kept the model and exposed it at several exhibitions. In 1927 he completed La carnosa, a small terracotta now at the Revoltella Museum, and in 1928 he completed the bronze Ingenua and the plaster cast Donna semplice. In 1932 he produced the plaster cast Eve. Rovan completed several other portraits of prominent intellectuals and artists of the day, including Giani Stuparich's (1934), and Scipio Slataper's (1955-56).

In 1935 he moved again to Rome, for work this time, and lived there until 1947. During this period, he also worked for the film industry at Cinecittà.

Rovan died on 3 November 1965 at the Ospedale Maggiore of Trieste.
