= Biagio Marin =

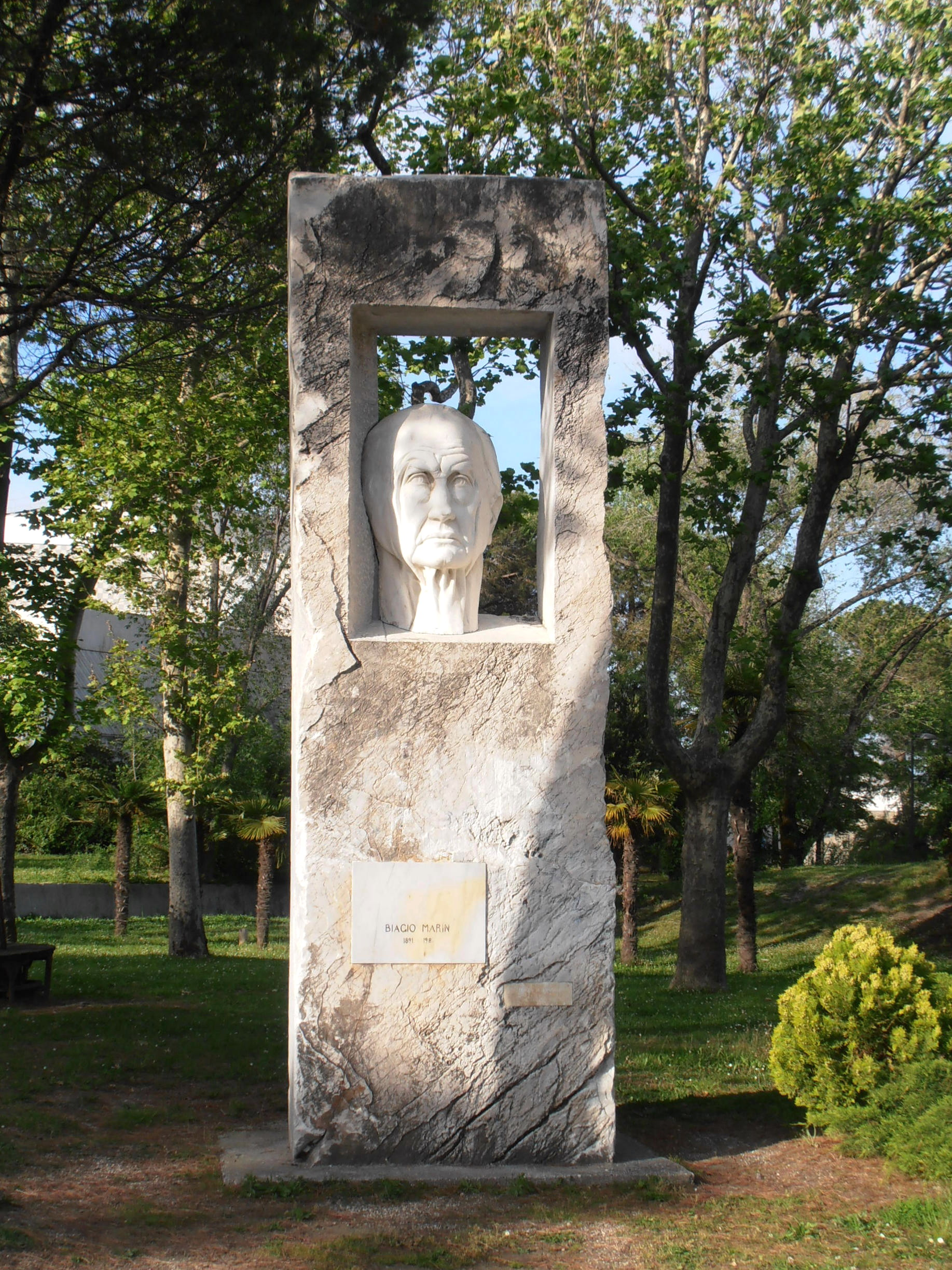
- Born: 29 June 1891; Grado, Austria-Hungary
- Died: 24 December 1985 (aged 94); Grado, Italy
- Occupations: Poet; professor; teacher; librarian
- Spouse: Pina Marini
- Writing career
- Notable works: e.g. La vita xe fiama: Poesie 1963-1969; I canti de l'isola; Nel silenzio più teso
- Literary movement: Dialectal poetry

Biagio Marin (Italian: [ˈbjaːdʒo maˈrin]; Venetian: Biaxio Marin [ˈbjazjo maˈɾiŋ]; 29 June 1891 – 24 December 1985) was a Venetian and Italian poet, best known for his poems in the Venetian language. In his writings he never obeyed rhetoric or poetics. He only employed a few hundred words for his poems.

== Early life ==
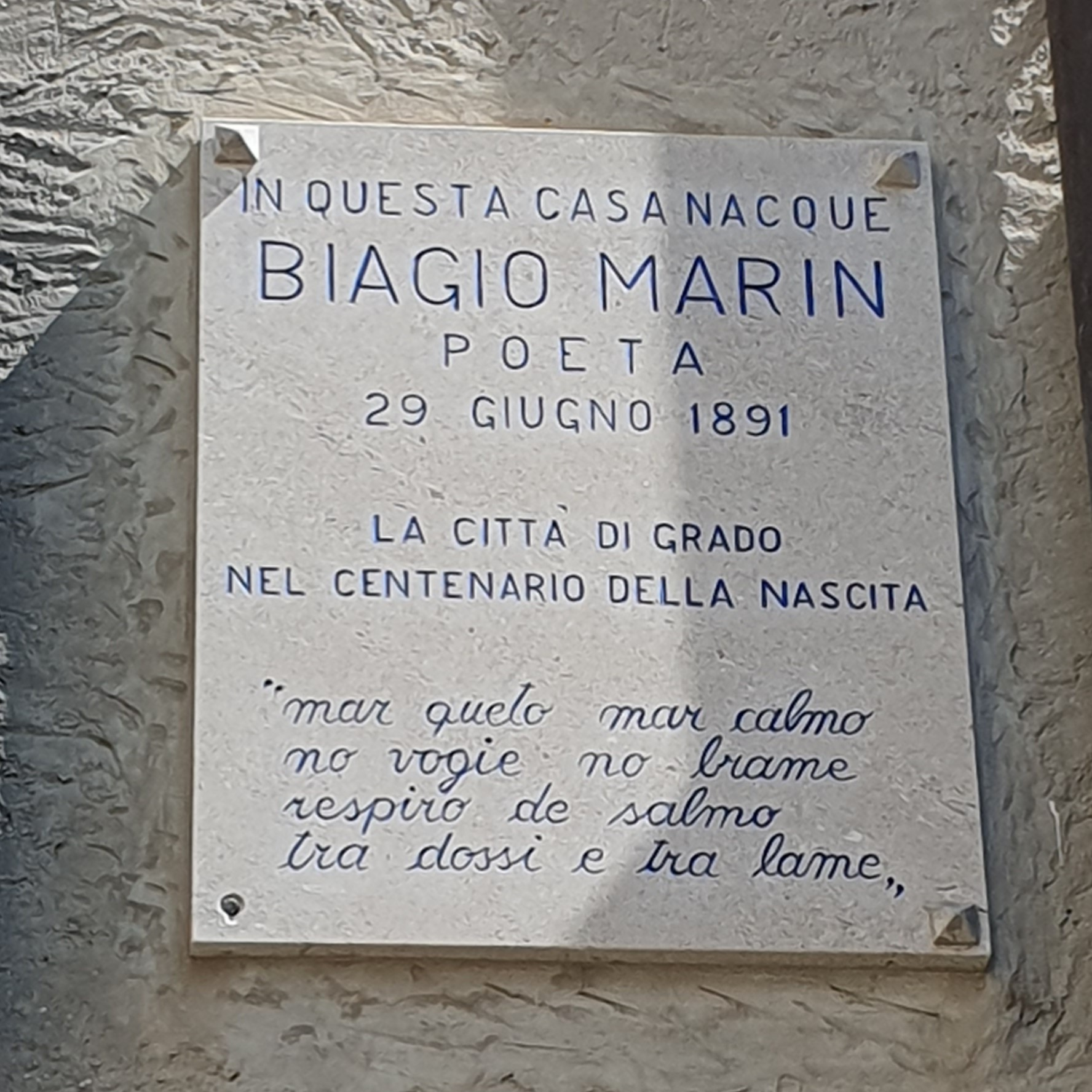
Here-was-born plaque in Grado

Biagio Marin was born on 29 June 1891 in the coastal town of Grado, in what was then the Austro-Hungarian county of Gorizia and Gradisca. His family was a middle-class family of modest origins, his father, Antonio Raugna, was an innkeeper. His mother Maria Raugna died early in his life, and he was then raised by his paternal grandmother. In his youth, he was an irredentist. He was sent to the gymnasium in Görz, where his education was in German, there he started to write literary texts in German. After Görz he went to study in Venice, and Florence. In Florence he met the writers Scipio Slataper, Giani Stuparich, Carlo Stuparich, Umberto Saba and Virgilio Giotti. He started to write for the magazine Voce (Voice), which was then the most famous Italian magazine of its time. There he began to write his first poems in the Venetian-Friulian dialect. In 1912 he began to study in Vienna. There he read Russian and Scandinavian authors and met the Austrian educator Friedrich Wilhelm Foerster, who had great influence upon his subsequent choices of study and work. He published the book "Fiuri de tapo", which is the first serious poetry book in the Venetian-Friulian dialect. During his studies in Vienna, there was an Italian student demonstration in favour of the Italian University in Triest, where he was sent as the spokesman for the demonstrators to the dean. In the conversation with the dean, he declared that he wished for Austria's defeat in the war. After two years in Vienna he returned to Florence. He participated in debates with his friends Umberto Saba and Scipio Slataper in Cafe Aragno about the war, and if artists should go to war.

== World War One ==
In 1914 he was sent to Maribor as a soldier for the 47th Infantry Regiment. He deserted to Italy and was already infected with tuberculosis, but still, he fought as a soldier in the Italian army against the Austrian troops. He graduated in philosophy under Bernardino Varisco, the fascistic philosopher Giovanni Gentile whose idealistic doctrine had already exerted a profound influence on him, and was the chairman of the committee. Varisco offered his pupil a place at the University. But Marin was eager to run to the front. Arriving in Stra nel Veneto he suffered from a relapse. When an Italian captain treated him boorishly, he protested with the words "Wir Österreicher sind an einen anderen Stil gewöhnt" "Captain, you are a villain; we Austrians are accustomed to different manners"

== World War Two ==
In the 1940s he wrote in his diaries that he believed that only the Nazis could bring order to Europe. Hearing about the Concentration Camp Risiera di San Sabba shocked and depressed him. In 1945 he involved himself in the Liberal part of the Comitato di Liberazione Nazionale On 27 April 1945 he was asked if he could preside on the Committee for the Liberation of Trieste, and become its president.

== Career ==
Marin landed a position as Professor at the Scuola Magistrale in Görz, but had to leave following a dispute about his teaching method with the clergy at the school. He used the Gospel as a teaching text. Next, he was employed as a school inspector under the mandate of Gradisca d'Isonzo. From 1923 until 1937 he worked as the director of the tourism agency in Grado and as a librarian. Subsequently, he worked as a teacher of history, philosophy and literature in Triest until 1941. His next vocation was to be the librarian of the Assicurazioni Generali in Trieste.

== Late life ==
In 1968 he moved back to Grado, where he resided in a house at the beach. His eyesight deteriorated, and for the rest of his life he was nearly blind and deaf After his death his private library was moved to the Biblioteca Civica in Grado.

== Private life ==
In 1914 he married Pina Marini with whom he had four children, including Gioiella and Falco. He knew the family of Art-deco artist and designer Josef Maria Auchentaller, so well that he wrote about an affair Emma Auchentaller had when the couple visited Grado. His son Falco Marin was a poet and essayist, who died during World War Two in a fight against the Yugoslav partisans in the Province of Ljubljana, Slovenia on 25 July 1943. Shortly before he had joined an anti-fascistic group. In 1977 his nephew Guy committed suicide, and a year later his wife Pina Marini died.

The writer Claudio Magris considered himself to have been one of Biagio Marin's best friends. He also said that Marin was both brother and father to him. Immediately after the death of his friend, Pier Paolo Pasolini, Marin composed a Cycle of poems called "El critoleo del corpo fracasao" about him.

== Work ==
Marin's poems, written in the Venetian language, are about the daily life and simple landscapes of his native land. He used the "lingua franca" that the merchants of the city used for his writings. He was influenced by Friedrich Hölderlin and Heinrich Heine. Religious thematics sometimes occur in his work. Andrea Zanzotto and Pier Paolo Pasolini had some difficulties with the existence of religious thematics in Marin's work. In 1970, the poet decided to publish all the poems written at that time in one volume, which, apropos to his sentimental attachment to his land, was titled "Songs from the Island." His output in the 1970s gained him the attention of Italian audiences. He was now obligated to write in Italian so that everybody in Italian could understand him. Despite this, he only wrote one book in Italian called "Acquamarina" in 1973. In 1985 he said that publishers were reluctant to publish even a selection of his poetry.

== Influence ==
Marin's book "Nel silenzio più teso" is in the Unesco Collection of representative works. He was one of the Founders of the Circolo della Cultura e delle Arti. He was active for many years as president of the "Circolo di cultura italo-austriaco" in Trieste, and he was among the first leaders of the "Incontri Culturali Mitteleuropei" in Gorizia. For Pier Paolo Pasolini, Marin's poems were the greatest Italian verses written in a contemporary dialect. Luigi Dallapiccola´s first work was named after the first book by Marin, Fiuri de tapo. It used Poems by Marin. Peter Handke cites a poem of Marin's in his book "Gestern unterwegs" In 1983 a research centre was created, which has its headquarters in the Public Library "Falco Marin". A National Prize called "POESIA IN DIALETTO" is awarded each year to a writer of dialect poetry by the centre, the prize taking its name from Marin. The centre also awards thesis works regarding Marin.

== Bibliography ==
=== Poems ===
- 1912 - Fiuri de tapo, Gorizia, republished 1999
- 1922 - La girlanda de gno suore, Gorizia, republished 2008
- 1927 - Canzone piccole, Udine,
- 1949 - Le litànie de la madona republished 2007
- 1951 - I canti de l'Isola, Udine,
- 1953 - Sénere colde, Rome,
- 1957 - Trìstessa de la sera, Verona,
- 1958 - L'estadela de S. Martin, Caltanissetta,
- 1959 - El fogo del ponente, Venice,
- 1961 - Solitàe, a cura di P.P. Pasolini, Milan,
- 1961 - I mesi dell'anno, Triest,
- 1962 - 12 poesie, Milan,
- 1963 - Elegìe istriane, Milan,
- 1964 - Il non tempo del mare, 1912–1962, Milan
- 1965 - Dopo la longa ìstae, Milan,
- 1965 - Elogio delle conchiglie, Milan,
- 1966 - La poesia è un dono, Milan,
- 1967 - E! mar de l'eterno, Milan,
- 1969 - Quanto più moro, Milao,
- 1969 - La vose de le scusse, Milan,
- 1969 - El picolo nio, Gorizia,
- 1970 - La vita xe fiama. Poesie 1963-1969, Turin,
- 1970 - I canti de l'Isola, 1912–1969, Triest,
- 1970 - Le litanie de la Madona, Grado,
- 1970 - La vita xe fiama: Poesie 1963-1969, Edited by Claudio Magris, Preface by Pier Paolo Pasolini
- 1971 - Friuli, Venezia, Giulia,
- 1973 - Aquamarina
- 1974 - El vento de l'Eterno se fa teso, Milan,
- 1974 - A sol calao, Milan,
- 1976 - El crìtoleo del corpo fracasao, Milan,
- 1976 - Pan de pura farina,
- 1977 - Stele cagiùe, Milan,
- 1978 - In memoria, Milan,
- 1980 - Nel silenzio più teso, Milan, edited by Biagio Marin and Claudio Magris
- 1981 - Poesie, Edited by Claudio Magris and Edda Serra
- 1982 - La vita xe fiama e altri versi, 1978–1981, edited by Biagio Marin and Claudio Magris
- 1982 - E anche il vento tase, Genova,
- 1982 - La girlanda de gno suore,
- 1985 - La vose de la sera, Milan,
- 2005 - La pace lontana: diari 1941-1950
- 2007 - Le due rive: reportages adriatici in prosa e in versi
- 2007 - Authoritratti e impegno civile: scritti rari e inediti dell'archivio Marin della Fondazione Cassa di Risparmio di Gorizia : Biagio Marin

=== Prose ===
- 1955 - Grado l'isola d'oro, Grado,
- 1956 - Gorizìa la città mutilata, Gorìzia,
- 1965 - I delfini - Slataper, Milan,
- 1967 - Strade e rive di Trieste, Milan,

=== Other ===
- 1962 - Ricordo di Carlo Michelstaedter in: Studi Goriziani No. XXXII [1962]: page. 4f

=== About his work ===
- Bertazzolo Nicola, 2010 - "La Vita E Ll Opere Di"
- Erbani Francis, 2005 - The Republic 23 September 2005
- Dante Maffia, 2001 - "BIAGIO MARIN"
- Pericle Camuffo, 2000 - Biagio Marin, la poesia, i filosofi
- 1997 - Poesia italiana del Novecento, by Ermanno Krumm and Tiziano Rossi
- 1996 - Leggere poesia, Atti del Convegno
- Anna De Simone (ed.), 1992 - L’isola Marin
- Giuseppe Radole, 1991 - I musicisti e la poesia di Biagio Marin
- E. Serra (ed.), 1981 - "Poesia e fortuna di Biagio Marin"
- 1980 - "Il silenzio di Marin" in Nuova Rivista Europea
- A. Zanzotto, 1977 - "Poesia che ascolta le onde" in Corriere della sera
- L. Borsetto, 1974 - "La poetica di Biagio Marin" in La rassegna della letteratura italiana
- C. Marabini, 1973 - "La ciave e il cerchio"
- E. Guagnini (ed.), 1973 - "El vento de l'eterno se fa teso"

== Prizes ==
- 1965 - Bagutta Prize
