= Teresina Bontempi =

Swiss writer and editor

Teresina Bontempi (Locarno, 1883 – Cevio, 1968) was an Italian-speaking Swiss writer and editor from Canton Ticino, Switzerland. She promoted Italian irredentism in southern Switzerland in the 1930s with her magazine L' Adula.

== Biography ==
In 1912 she founded the magazine "L' Adula" whose publishing program was: "Fight for justice and persistent assertion of our Italian soul. The first movement reflects a decided reaction against unspeakable cowardice of our life, the latter are common to all countries are left alone, worked by medieval lords, and where the culture is poor. The second point is to say, firmly and unassailable, our Italian-..."

Her name is linked to the Italian irredentism of Ticino and the newspaper/magazine The Adula of which she was the director. It was at the centre of an ongoing controversy in Ticino and in Switzerland throughout the first half of the 20th century, particularly between 1912 and 1936.

The father, James, was Secretary of the Department of Education of the Canton of Ticino, and Teresina studied to become an Inspector of elementary schools of the canton.

The activity of Teresina Bontempi should be seen in relation to the severe economic and social conditions which were in Ticino between the two world wars, and with reference to Italian culture and language, with the resulting claims ("Rivendicazioni") submitted to federal authorities in 1924 and supported by all parties in Ticino.

Together with a friend, Rosetta Colombi, she founded the magazine "The Adula" (named from the mountain that divides the Ticino from German-speaking areas in Switzerland), printed in Bellinzona, in which she denounced in particular the alleged progressive Germanisation which was taking place in the Canton Ticino. The tone of the newspaper was sharpened under Benito Mussolini's influence in the 1930s, reaching some pro-fascist sympathies for Italian irredentism.

In this newspaper collaborated known exponents of culture, not only from Ticino, but also from the Kingdom of Italy: Giuseppe Prezzolini (which opened in 1912 on the "Voice" a discussion about the "Italian characteristics" of the Ticino in 1913 and reserved a number of the magazine on the theme involving among others Francis Church), Giovanni Papini, Giani Stuparich, Scipio Slataper and others.

She was even the favourite pupil of Maria Montessori, who introduced her teaching methods in the Canton Ticino thanks to Bontempi.

The Swiss authorities began to persecute her in 1933, then closed several times her newspaper/magazine and finally removed her from teaching. In 1935, she was convicted on charges of irredentism and spent a few months in jail, which she served in the prison of Lugano.

She retired from all activities, was exiled to Italy and from 1936 to 1945 resided in Parma near her brother. Back in Switzerland, she was initially relegated to her town of Menzonio and then went to the hospital of Cevio, where she died in perfect solitude and deliberately forgotten.

In the 1990s, Elda Simonett-Giovanoli, another Italian-speaking Swiss writer, remembered her as a woman who, nearly alone, defended her opinions with courage.

== Works ==
In exile in Italy Bontempi wrote her Diary of Captivity, published successfully in the postwar period.

== Bibliography ==
- Numbers of "The Adula".
- T. Bontempi, Diary of captivity. Armando Dadò, publisher. Locarno, 1999.
- Ferdinand Crespi. Unredeemed Ticino. The border dispute. From the cultural battle of the Adula: invasion plans. Franco Angeli ed. Milan, 2004.
- Sapphires, Gabriel. The Empire that Mussolini dreamed for Italy, The Boopen publisher. Pozzuoli (Naples). October 2008

== See also ==
- Italia irredenta
- Canton Ticino
- Italian Swiss
