= Tristano Alberti =

Italian sculptor

- Born: Tristano Alberti; 25 June 1915; Trieste, Italy
- Died: 1 February 1976 (aged 60); Trieste, Italy
- Known for: Sculpture, painting, drawing
- Notable work: San Sebastiano (San Sebastiano), 1948; The Cat (Il gatto), 1951; Nazario Sauro, 1965; San Giusto d'Oro (San Giusto), 1965
- Awards: Legion d'Oro OIPC (a United Nations institution)

Tristano Alberti (June 25, 1915 – February 1, 1976) was an Italian sculptor. Inspired by Auguste René Rodin, after attending ornate sculptors class at the Alessandro Volta technical institute in Trieste, he choose the same craftsman-like approach in Early Modern Sculpture: Rodin, Degas, Matisse, Brancusi, Picasso, Gonzalez and later, in late 1940s and early 1950s, developed a fully personal style in figuratively representing human and animal-themed chalks and bronzes, possessing a unique ability to model passion, rage and strong emotions. He is known for his sacred art and monuments, and such sculptures as San Sebastiano, Cat, Nazario Sauro and San Giusto. The latter being yearly and awarded as a copy and special prize to prominent people in Trieste.

While Tristano Alberti's goal remained the search for innovation and originality, he was influenced by Henry Moore and Pablo Picasso, and in contact and friendship with Marcello Mascherini, Ruggero Rovan, Ugo Carà. Tristano Alberti never changed his style and continued his research into human body and physicality along his whole life. His art was included in several exhibitions in Italy and Europe, and in New York and Australia, but he remained in Trieste, living with his wife and muse, Fernanda Polli (“Dina”), until his passing.

== Biography ==
Tristano Alberti was born in Trieste on June 25, 1915 from Bruno Alberti and Giovanna Corrado. His parents will then have two more children, Adriano (1919), also an artist graduated in Cà Foscari (Venice), and Gigliola (1925). The father, who widowed early, will marry again with Luigia Sushmel; they will have no other children.

During his youth, the artist with Alfonso Canciani at Alessandro Volta institute. Alberti does not complete the course of study; he leaves the school and continues at the Istituto Magistrale, although he retains his passion for the figurative arts, which are now intensely part of his life. As a self-taught, he tries to experiences, through sculpture, every type of expressiveness that the raw material, modeled, can create: he uses chalk models and bronze.

At the age of seventeen, he meets Fernanda Polli, his future wife; she is fourteen. From that first meeting, the two will never leave each other. Nicknamed "Dina", Fernanda will be his muse and source of inspiration: in his words, “the emotion that will give life to many of my works”.

In the mid-1930s, Alberti works as an employee at the Fabbrica Macchine di Sant'Andrea in Trieste, which at the time mainly develops and builds naval engines. Despite the commitment of the work, which takes him a long time, Alberti begins to devote himself, in his spare hours, with even greater intensity to sculpture. It is precisely in these years that he participates in the artistic exhibitions organized in Trieste by Fascist Syndicate, at the Muzio de Tommasini public garden: Alberti has no interest in politics, however Italy is fully under Benito Mussolini regime and freedom of expression is limited by it. In 1937, Alberti made his first personal exhibition always in his hometown, at the Michelazzi salon: the artist also approached the portrait, a genre that from now on he will always love. He realizes, in plaster, a series of heads: 'My mother', 'Gigliola' (his sister), 'My brother' (Adriano), 'a Friar' (for it he is inspired by his uncle).

In the 1940s, in addition to the portrait, Tristano Alberti became passionate about anatomy and modeled a series of personal interpretation nudes, which refer back to the art of Auguste Rodin, Aristide Maillol and Emile-Antoine Bourdelle.

In 1941, during the Second World War, Tristan marries Fernanda Polli. The family lives in Via dei Leo 15; nearby, there is also the artist's studio. In 1944, the Allied bombing of Trieste destroys Alberti's house, works and studio: following the event, which deeply affects him, the couple moves to via Pacinotti, near the castle and the cathedral of San Giusto. In 1945, at the end of the conflict, Alberti immediately resumes his artistic activity: in that same year he participates in a collective exhibition at the Trieste art gallery, and in 1946, only a year later, at the first exhibition of National League art, in the same gallery. Also in 1946, he moves with his wife to an attic in via Crispi, which will become his new studio.

Year 1948 sees him participating, with three sculptures ('Deposition', 'Saint George fighting the dragon', and the 'Lamentation of Women') in the II Giuliana Sacred Art Exhibition. Subsequently, other appearances of his works will follow at exhibitions on a religious theme, also internationally. In addition to the animal-themed chalks and bronzes, the artist, in the late 1940s and early 1950s, devoted himself to the representation of acrobats and contortionists. During this period he participated in exhibitions and reviews in Italy, and exhibited some circus-themed sculptures in the Pavilion of the Trieste fair and in Vienna at the Austellung der Triestner Künstler. Then, he took part in an exhibition tour in Australia with the bronze 'San Sebastiano'.

In those years, in fact, Alberti enjoyed considerable success by winning prizes and awards, and the number of commissions that he receives is remarkable. He is asked to make the bust of Umberto Felluga, the relief placed at the Fonda Savio kindergarten in Trieste, the portrait of Alcide De Gasperi, the poet's plaster Virgilio Giotti from Trieste, the herm of Giorgio and Guglielmo Reiss Romoli (now at Villaggio del Fanciullo, in Sistiana), the bronze herm of Santorio Santorio (now placed at the entrance of the hospital in Poggioreale del Carso).

In the 1950s, in Alberti's way of understanding art changes: portraits became simpler and closer to modern art. In 1951, a sketch by the artist was chosen for the creation of a bronze statue and a seal for the "Children's Festival Film Award”. Also in the same year, he took part in the VI National Quadrennial of Art in Rome, where he won the sculpture prize: one of the works on display is the 'Cat', and it is thanks to the ‘Cat’ that Alberti began to produce animal sculptures. The artists awarded at the VI Quadrennial in Rome exhibit their works in a traveling exhibition that goes beyond Italian borders, reaching France, and then returns to our country ending in Siena.

In 1951, Rinaldo Alberti was born, the only son of Tristano and Fernanda.

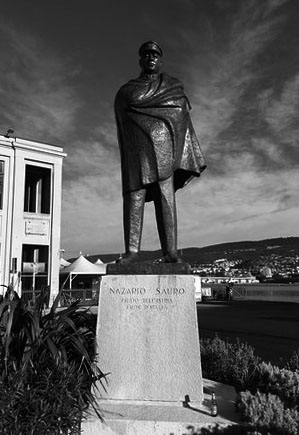
"Nazario Sauro", monument in Trieste sculpted by Tristano Alberti

In 1953, on the occasion of the "II Children's Festival", a competition was organized for the construction of a fountain; Alberti takes part and wins together with the artist Franco Asco. Unfortunately, the fountain, which was supposed to rise in the square in front of the Trieste central railway station, in Piazza della Libertà, will never be built.

In 1954 the sculpture of the 'Leopard', present in the exhibition of the winners at the VI Quadrennial, was purchased by the Revoltella Museum. Also in this year Alberti wins the second prize of the first degree competition for the construction of a sacred monument: the effigy of the ‘Immaculate Conception’ of Alberti is located today in the church in via Capodistria, also in Trieste.

In 1956, Tristano Alberti moves his studio in Via Timeus, and it is precisely here that he realizes a course of sculpture and embossing on metals, organized by the Popular University of Trieste. Subsequently he taught at the State Art Institute of the city.

In 1964 he exhibits is ‘Woman in the Bora’ in New York.

The following year, 1965, Tristano exhibiters in Montevideo (Uruguay). On June 10 of the same year the monument to Nazario Sauro, still located in front of the Maritime Station of Trieste, is revealed to the public. In 1967 he realizes bronze relieves in Tempio di Monte Grisa; 1968 is the year of bust of Silio Valerio, and 1969 the monument to Petrarch, now in the homonymous Trieste high school Liceo Petrarca.

In 1969 he resumes his work on the circus theme; the same year, he opens a new exhibition at the city's Municipal Art Hall: his last personal exhibition will be in 1974, at the Trieste Rectors Gallery in Trieste. In 1976, he was awarded the Cimento d'oro prize of art and culture for the work done in 1975. Shortly after, Tristano Alberti is struck by a sudden illness: he died while leaving his workshop and walking home in Trieste, on February 1, 1976. A telegram, sent by Italian President, Giovanni Leone, expressed condolence to the family: "Scompare uno sculture sensibile e di alto prestigio che seppe conciliare gli orientamenti dell'arte contemporanea con la compattezza e l'equilibrio del classicismo". ("A sensitive and high-prestige sculptor passes away; was able to reconcile the orientations of contemporary art with the compactness and balance of classicism".

== Works ==
Tristano Alberti underlined his vision of the art world of his time with these words, written into letters to his family; unlike other artists of his time, Alberti remained in fact very close to his family and to his hometown, frequently avoiding contacts with people outside what he considered a ‘restricted circle’. Moreover, the local artistic situation in Trieste immediately after the Second World War and during Allied military administration, which lasted until 1954, was different from that of the other Italian cities: each artist tried to establish his own stylistic independence, and contacts with the outside world were not easy. Most probably this contributed to create Alberti's style: although abstract and informal art was in vogue in the 1950s of the Italian post-war period, Alberti did not break his link with figurative art, already very visible in his previous sculptural portraits, those of the 1930s and 1940s. Many of his works also show an interest in primitive, African and Oceanic art, a reminiscence of the earlier Trieste, an important port and sea commerce location, with routes to remote countries.

From the dialogues with his son Rinaldo, also a sculptor, and his nephew Massimiliano, writer, Alberti's profound conviction emerges of the need for continuous artistic research and individuality, expressing himself through every means available and in any circumstance, without ever stopping. Hence the sacrifice to continue creating every day, despite work and family, sometimes sacrificing everything else. Alberti instinctively modeled, in an emotional, spontaneous way, and arousing emotion in those who observed it, rejecting fashions and patterns and always giving space to imagination and discontinuity.

In addition to the works of the local artists with whom he was in contact, such as Marcello Mascherini, Ruggero Rovan, Riccardo Bastianutto and Ugo Carà, he was in touch with other well-known Italian sculptors, such as Arturo Martini and Marino Marini. It is from them that Alberti takes inspiration for the two nudes ‘Boy in the sun’ and ‘Relaxed woman’; in ‘Boy in the Sun’ an approach to Henry Moore's ‘Woman lying down’ is seen. In the representation of the human figure, Tristano Alberti never completely detaches himself, during his research, from the traditional form; in fact, he avoids reaching Mascherini's extremism, aiming at making human figures very simple, stylized, far from academic classicism. The heads sculpted by Alberti in the 1950s abandon the veracity of the features of real human physiognomy to give space to a formal simplification, which comes close to the synthesis of antiquities. Alberti’s interest in primitive art had already impressed Mascherini in the 1930s, leading him to create a self-portrait (1932); Ugo Carà will also follow the wave of the ‘indirect’ master, Mascherini. The works of the Sixties by Tristano Alberti expand in space and shrink in the forms, becoming almost thin threads, which however retain a certain three-dimensionality. Mascherini's art, as he himself stressed on several occasions, aimed at the recovery of classicism in an anti-academic sense, and also became part of the Trieste artistic culture itself. Alberti sought, through his works, to create a continuity, a link between the art of the past and his art, especially with Mediterranean culture. This ‘Mediterraneanness’ played a fundamental role in Trieste at the time, becoming a typical trait of many, if not all, of the artists who resided or moved in its context. Marcello Mascherini, in addition to having brought to Trieste, in the distant 1926, a bit of Antinovecentismo - when, however, the art of the time was in full Novecentismo - experienced in the post-war period a new stylistic form that spread in Italy in those years: Abstract art. The sculptural forms are simple, geometric, and also in Alberti's works we find these experiments. In the 1950s, Tristano Alberti gave also life to many animal-themed sculptures giving them a simple form, full of dynamism, capable of integrating and interacting with the space in which they are located: such as the mentioned ‘Cat’ (1950–51 ). Other sculptures, such as ‘The Goat’, and the "Giraffe", are inspired by the art of Pablo Picasso. Nor should we forget the numerous series of 'Bulls': from the forms closest to reality, in the 'bulls', we move on to a formal synthesis; also the series of Alberti's 'Horses' achieves an essential anatomy, far from the real physiognomy. Tristano Alberti remains a Triestine sculptor who managed to give substance to the sculpture; as Arturo Martini said, "substance matters more than style".

At the end of the 1960s, Alberti creates ‘San Giusto d’Oro’, which is awarded every year as a recognition by Assostampa (journalists of) Friuli-Venezia Giulia, to people who have honored the city of Trieste: in 2019, the prize was awarded to Zeno D'Agostino for the work done as president of the Port System Authority of the Eastern Adriatic Sea. A copy of this same sculpture is also since 1984 on the sea bed, in front of Miramare castle, dedicated to San Giusto, the Martyr that, in the Catholic tradition, protects the city of Trieste and his seamen on all seas of the world.

Many of Tristano Alberti sculptures are preserved by his heirs (Alberti family), in Trieste (Deposito eredi Alberti).

== Exhibitions ==
- 1936, Trieste Sindacato Fascista Belle Arti (will also be present in 1938, 1939, 1940, 1941)
- 1937, Trieste Salone Michelazzi (personal)
- 1944, Trieste Galleria d’Arte Trieste (will also be present in 1945, 1946, 1947, 1948)
- 1948 Trieste Mostra Giuliana d’Arte Sacra
- 1949, Trieste I Mostra d’Arte Triveneta
- 1950, Monfalcone Mostra degli Artisti d’Italia
- 1951, Torino La Quadriennale 1951, Palazzo Sociale al Valentino (3 maggio-3 giugno 1951)
- 1951, Padova IX Biennale d’Arte Triveneta (2-24 giugno 1951)
- 1951, Milano II Mostra degli Artisti d’Italia, Palazzo Reale (autunno-inverno 1951-1952)
- 1952, Roma VI Quadriennale Nazionale d’Arte di Roma (December 1951 to April 1952)
- 1952, Trieste III Mostra Giuliana d’Arte Sacra, Galleria Casanuova (April 1952)
- 1952, Trieste II Mostra Associazione Artisti d’Italia (whole year 1952)
- 1952, Trieste Mostra d’Arte figurativa degli Artisti Triestini, Fiera di Trieste (September 1952)
- 1952, Pisa Exhibition of Artists of IV Quadriennale Roma, Museo Nazionale di San Matteo (16-30 giugno)
- 1953, Siena “Exposition des laureats” presented by “Dante Alighieri” association Bordeaux, Pinacoteca Nazionale di Siena (July to September 1953)
- 1955, Milano, II Mostra Biennale Italiana di Arte Sacra per la casa
- 1955, Wien (Austria), Austellung der Triestiner Kùnstler
- 1955, Padova, Biennale d'Arte Triveneta
- 1955, Sydney, Australia, Bissietta Art Gallery
- 1956, Bologna, II Mostra Nazionale d'Arte Sacra Contemporanea
- 1957, Suzzara, X Premio Suzzara
- 1957, Napoli, III Congresso Nazionale UCAI (first National Figurative Art exhibition, Palazzo Reale)
- 1959, Novara, IV Internazionale d'Arte Sacra
- 1959, Roma, VIII Quadriennale Nazionale d'Arte
- 1960, Firenze, XI Mostra Nazionale del premio del Fiorino
- 1960, Bologna, IV Biennale Nazionale d'Arte Sacra
- 1961, Padova, XIV Biennale d'Arte Triveneta
- 1962, Bologna, V Biennale Nazionale d'Arte Sacra contemporanea
- 1963, Milano, II Mostra Nazionale d'Arte Figurativa
- 1964, New York, Trieste Artists' Exhibit in New York
- 1965, Montevideo, Grafica Italiana Contemporanea exhibition
- 1966, Firenze, XVII Mostra Internazionale d'Arte premio del Fiorino
- 1967, Arezzo, Premio Oreficerie Gioiellerie Uno A Erre
- 1968, Ancona, II Annuale Italiana d'Arte Grafica
- 1968, Roma, Rassegna di Arti Figurative e di Architettura della Venezia Giulia
- 1973, Trieste, Il Circo nel mondo

== Awards ==
For his arts, Tristano Alberti received these awards:

- 1951 – IV Quadriennale Romana
- 1952 – Festival Nazionale del Cinema Italiano (for the bronze that he realized)
- 1952 – Mostra Giuliana d’Arte Sacra
- 1956 – Mostra d’Arte Sacra Nazionale Trieste
- 1960 – Mostra Antichi Dipinti and Contemporary Sculpture in Verbania
- 1962 – Accademia dei 500 (Roma)
- 1965 – Geneve International Award for Artists
- 1965 – Premio Europa Arte Internazionale
- 1969 – Premio UNO.A.ERRE Arezzo
- 1973 – Mostra di pittura contemporanea di Pompei
- 1975 – “Cimento d’oro’ art and culture award in Roma

He received also the “Legion d’Oro” Organisation Internationale de Protection Civile O.I.P.C.
