= Roberto Bazlen =

Italian writer and publicist (1902–1965)

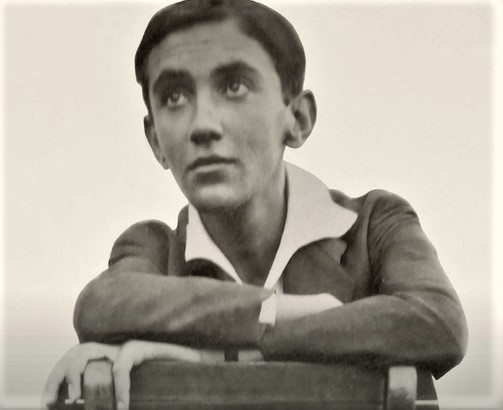
Bazlen in the 1930s

Roberto Bazlen, also known as Bobi Bazlen (10 June 1902 – 27 July 1965) was an Italian writer and publicist.

== Biography ==
Bazlen was born in Trieste on 10 June 1902. His father, Eugenio Bazlen, a Lutheran native of Stuttgart, died one year after his birth, and he was raised by the family of his mother, Clotilde Levi Minzi, from Trieste, belonging to the Jewish middle class. He studied in the German language school Real Gymnasium, where he became passionate about literary subjects, encouraged by his teacher, Professor Mayer. After he left Trieste, he lived in Genoa, Milan and Rome.

He was a friend of Luciano Foà, Adriano Olivetti, Giacomo Debenedetti, Italo Calvino and Eugenio Montale, and part of the circle of artists of the Caffè Garibaldi together with Umberto Saba, who in 1921 dedicated his Canzoniere to his "six readers" Bazlen, Romanellis, Giotti, Schiffrer, Rovan and Bolaffio. It was Bazlen who recommended to Montale Svevo's Confessions of Zeno (of which he was one of the first discoverers).

Bazlen never published anything in life, but a posthumous collection of his writings (1984, which also includes his letters to Montale) included works like Lettere editoriali (1968), Note senza testo (1970) and Il capitano di lungo corso. Bazlen's life is at the center of the novel Lo stadio di Wimbledon (1983) by Daniele Del Giudice, published in English as A Fictional Inquiry (2025) by New Vessel Press, and which was adapted to film by Mathieu Amalric under the title Le stade de Wimbledon (2002).

Roberto Calasso's final monograph, published the day after his death, was devoted to the subject of Bazlen's life and study.
