= Ernesto (film) =

- Directed by: Salvatore Samperi
- Written by: Umberto Saba (book); Barbara Alberti; Amadeo Paganini
- Produced by: Jose Frade; Michael Fengler
- Starring: Martin Halm; Michele Placido; Virna Lisi
- Cinematography: Camillo Bazzoni
- Music by: Carmelo Bernaola
- Release date: 1979
- Running time: 98 minutes
- Countries: Italy; Spain; Germany
- Language: Italian

Ernesto is a 1979 film directed by Salvatore Samperi and starring Martin Halm. The movie is loosely based on Umberto Saba's novel of the same name.

== Plot ==
In Trieste, Austria-Hungary (Italy after the end of World War I) in 1911, Ernesto (Martin Halm) is a 17-year-old boy who lives with his widowed mother in the home of his violin-loving Jewish uncle and works in an office at a routine job. He espouses socialist views largely to cause his uncle distress. He discovers his homosexuality when he meets a stableboy (Michele Placido), who is not identified by name. They become infatuated with each other and have an intense sexual relationship, which develops against a realistic depiction of the social setting. Ernesto loses his job when his sexual behavior is discovered and reveals to his mother his same-sex relationship, which he continues to view as shameful. He is dishonest with his same-sex partner, and their relationship ends when Ernesto begins to visit a prostitute for sex.

Ernesto takes violin lessons where he meets 15-year-old Rachel and her twin brother Emilio, both depicted by the same actress (Lara Wendel). Both of the twins fall in love with Ernesto, who marries the sister, resolving his problems with his mother and uncle as well as his former employer. Having outgrown his years of spontaneity and exploration, Ernesto denies his sexual past when he encounters his first lover and refuses to recognize him.

== Cast ==
- Martin Halm as Ernesto
- Michele Placido as The Man / The stableman
- Virna Lisi as Ernesto's Mother
- Turi Ferro as Carlo Wilder
- Francisco Marsó as Uncle Giovanni
- Conchita Velasco as Aunt Regina
- Lara Wendel as Ilio/Rachele
- Gisela Hahn as Mrs. Luzzato
- Renato Salvatori as Cesco
- Stefano Madia as Andrea

== Awards ==
The film was entered into the 29th Berlin International Film Festival, where Michele Placido won the Silver Bear for Best Actor.
