= Bazlen =

Bazlen is a surname. Notable people with the surname include:

- Brigid Bazlen (1944–1989), American actress
- Roberto Bazlen (1902–1965), Italian writer and publicist
- Svenja Bazlen (born 1984), German triathlete
