= Liriche e idilli =

Poetry collection by Virgilio Giotti

Lyrics and Idylls
- Author: Virgilio Giotti
- Language: Italian
- Genre: Poetry
- Publisher: Solaria
- Publication date: 1931
- Publication place: Italy

Liriche e idilli (lit. '"Lyrics and Idylls"') is a collection of poems by Italian poet Virgilio Giotti. The poems are in the Italian language, and were published in 1931 in Florence in the homonym volume by Solaria. The volume was reviewed by Eugenio Montale for Pegaso and by Andrea Grande for l'Italia letteraria.

== Overview ==
The volume consists of a collection of poems in the Italian language, and as such it follows Giotti's Il mio cuore e la mia casa, published in 1920. Quantitatively, Giotti's production in the Italian language was scarce when compared with his work in the Triestine dialect; however, this is "largely compensated by the quality, that is by the intensity of human inspiration and genuine and original artistic value." In Giotti's Italian language poetry, the motif of "domestic intimacy" becomes prominent, and the poet is really "delicate and moved by the family, representing with a sense of affectionate tenderness the figures of his wife and children."

The poems of Lyrics and Idylls were composed in the 1920s (from 1920 to 1925), and were partially anticipated in 1931 by the Genoese journal Circoli, founded that same year by Adriano Grande, helped by editors Giacomo Debenedetti, Eugenio Montale, Camillo Sbarbaro, and Segio Solmi. The collection includes the compositions Il nonno e il nipotino, La capra all’albero, Gli amanti, Il dono, and Amore giocante. Gli amanti and Amore giocante were published in the 3rd issue of May–June, Quadretto di primavera, Muri, L'uva appesa, Oggetti, in the 6th issue of November–December. Montale and Grande, in their reviews, described Giotti's expression as imperceptibly divided from prose. Diego Valeri, writing for Le Tre Venezie, expressed some reservations, to which Giotti responded with a witty reply.
