= Tristano =

Tristano is both a given name and a surname.

Notable people with the given name include:

- Tristano Alberti (1915–1976), Italian sculptor
- Tristano Casanova (born 1983), German actor
- Tristano Codignola (1913–1981), Italian politician
- Tristano Martinelli (c. 1556 – 1630), Italian actor
- Tristano Pangaro (1922–2004), Italian footballer

Notable people with the surname include:

- Francesco Tristano Schlimé (born 1981), known professionally as Francesco Tristano, Luxembourgish classical and experimental pianist and composer
- Lennie Tristano (1919–1978), American jazz pianist, composer, arranger, and teacher of jazz improvisation
