= Scipio Slataper =

Italian writer

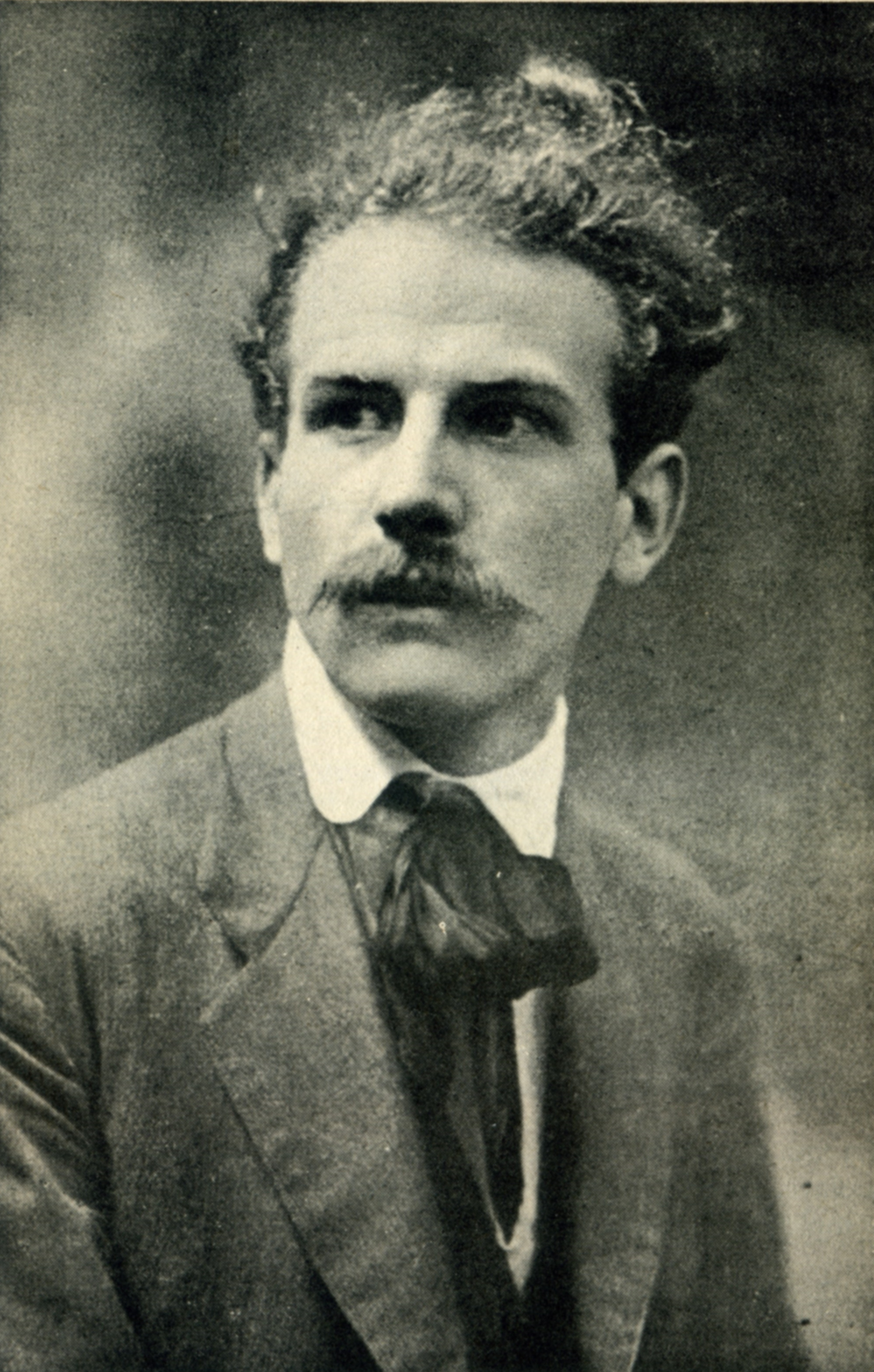
- Born: 14 July 1888; Trieste, Austrian Littoral, Austro-Hungarian Empire (now in Italy)
- Died: 3 December 1915 (aged 27); Podgora near Gorizia, County of Gorizia and Gradisca, Austria-Hungary (now in Italy)
- Occupations: essayist, novelist, literary critic
- Writing career
- Genres: essays, autobiography, travel literature
- Literary movement: Modernism

Scipio Slataper (14 July 1888 – 3 December 1915) was an Italian writer, most famous for his lyrical essay My Karst. He is considered, alongside Italo Svevo, the initiator of the prolific tradition of Italian literature in Trieste.

== Biography ==
Slataper was born to a relatively wealthy middle-class family in the city of Trieste, then part of the Austro-Hungarian Empire (today in Italy). After completing his high school studies in the native city, he moved to Florence in Italy, where he studied Italian philology. In Florence, he collaborated to the literary journal La Voce, edited by Giuseppe Prezzolini and Giovanni Papini. During his stay in Florence, he started writing essays and articles on the literary and cultural situation in Trieste. He maintained a close contact with his native city, collaborating with young Italian intellectuals from the Austrian Littoral, both those who lived in Italy and those who remained in their native region. Slataper's circle included the journalist and critic Giulio Caprin, author Giani Stuparich, his wife Elody Oblath and his brother Carlo Stuparich, the emerging literary critic Silvio Benco, and poets Umberto Saba, Virgilio Giotti and Biagio Marin.

After the suicide of his lover in 1910, Slataper retired to the village of Ocizla on the Karst Plateau above Trieste, where he wrote his best-known work, the lyrical essay My Karst (Italian: Il mio Carso), considered one of the masterpieces of Italian fin-de-siecle prose. The essay, in which Nietzschean influences can be seen, is an assertion of vitalism and primitive life force. The essay also contains political and philosophical reflections. Among other things, Slataper was polemical against the superficial business mentality of the Italian merchants of Trieste and criticized their anti-Slavic prejudices. On the other hand, the work contains highly controversial depictions and reflection on the "suppressed brutal and barbaric nature" of the Slovene peasants from the area.

My Karst was published in Florence in 1912, and it remained the only book Slataper published during his lifetime. In 1921, the book was translated into French by Benjamin Crémieux, which helped spread Slataper's popularity in Europe in the 1920s.

After graduation in 1912, Slataper moved to Hamburg in Germany, where he taught Italian at the local university. When Italy declared war on Austria-Hungary on 24 May 1915, he moved to Italy and volunteered to join the Italian Army. He was sent to the front along the Isonzo River. In December 1915, he was killed in the Fourth Battle of the Isonzo in the hills surrounding the town of Gorizia.

Slataper had a crucial influence in the creation of a distinct literary tradition in Trieste. Authors influenced by him include Giani and Carlo Stuparich, Fulvio Tomizza, Enzo Bettiza, Susanna Tamaro, Claudio Magris and others. He also influenced several Slovene writers, most notably Marjan Rožanc and Igor Škamperle.

== Works ==
- Il mio Carso. Florence: Libreria della Voce, 1912 (My Karst and My City and Other Essays. Edited, with an Introduction and Notes, by Elena Coda. Translated by Nicholas Benson and Elena Coda. Toronto: University of Toronto Press, 2020).
- I confini necessari all'Italia. Turin: L'Ora Presente, 1915.
- Ibsen (with an introduction by Arturo Farinelli). Turin: Bocca, 1916.
- Scritti letterari e critici ("Literary and Political Writings"), edited by Giani Stuparich. Rome: La Voce, 1920.
- Scritti politici ("Political Writings"). Rome: A. Stock, 1925.
- Lettere ("Letters"), edited by Giani Stuparich. Turin: Buratti, 1930.
- Epistolario, edited by Gianni Stuparich. Verona: Arnoldo Mondadori Editore, 1950.
- Appunti e note di diario, edited by Giani Stuparich. Milan: Arnoldo Mondadori Editore, 1953.
- Alle tre amiche: lettere, edited by Giani Stuparich. Verona: A. Mondadori, 1958.
- Le lettere a Maria, edited by Cesare Pagnini. Rome: G. Volpe, 1981.
- Passato ribele: dramma in un atto. Trieste: Edizioni Dedolibri, 1988.

== See also ==
- Carlo Michelstaedter
