= Vittorio Bolaffio =

Italian painter (1883–1931)

- Born: 6 March 1883; Trieste, Austrian Empire (present-day Italy)
- Died: 26 December 1931 (aged 48); Trieste, Italy
- Occupation: Painter

Vittorio Bolaffio (3 June 1883 – 26 December 1931) was an Italian painter.

== Biography ==
Bolaffio was born in Gorizia on 3 June 1883, to Amodeo (or Amadio) and Pia Gentilomo. His father owned arable land, and traded in wines; his family was of Jewish origin, of comfortable economic conditions. Having spent his early years mainly in Palmanova, Bolaffio was initially trained in Trieste, studying under Giovanni Cossar and Italico Brass: it was his teachers who advised him to continue his education in Florence and to turn to Giovanni Fattori. Between 1900 and 1902 he attended the artist's studio, and in a course held by Fattori he met Amedeo Modigliani. In 1907 Bolaffio joined the Trieste artistic circle, and in 1909 opened a studio in Trieste. In 1910 he went to Paris, where Modigliani also resided: the latter brought him into contact with the Parisian art environment, and Bolaffio met and was inspired by Matisse, Cézanne, and Gauguin.

After spending a period in Trieste after returning from Paris, in 1912 Bolaffio decided to embark as a fireman on the ships of the Lloyd Triestino and made numerous trips, reaching Asia. In 1913 he returned to Italy and was able to exhibit in Naples some paintings inspired by his travels to the East. Bolaffio was then called to arms at the outbreak of the First World War, and took part in the entire conflict, remaining deeply shocked. In 1919, when the war was over, he returned to live in Trieste. He made numerous portraits of illustrious personalities of the day, including Umberto Saba, Dario De Tuoni and Ruggero Rovan. In 1926 his father died and Bolaffio isolated himself from public life. On 15 December 1931 he donated the work Triptych of the Port to the Revoltella Museum. He died in Trieste on 26 December 1931.
