= Ernesto (novel) =

Unfinished novel by Umberto Saba

- First edition
- Author: Umberto Saba
- Language: Italian
- Genre: Novel
- Publisher: Einaudi
- Publication date: 1975
- Publication place: Italy
- Media type: Hardback and paperback
- Pages: 162 pp (hardback edition)

Ernesto is an unfinished novel by Umberto Saba (1883–1957), written in 1953 and published posthumously in 1975. It was his only work of fiction. It was largely autobiographical, including details about the title character's friendship and love for a violinist, and his attachment to his native Trieste. As one critic says: "he revisited not only the scenes but also the moods of his puberty".

A screenplay freely adapted from the novel served as the basis for an Italian-language film of the same name in 1979.

== Plot summary ==
The events in the novel take place in the course of a month in 1898 in Trieste. Ernesto, a 16-year-old apprentice clerk to a flour merchant named Wilder, lives with his mother and aunt. He and his mother rely on the charity of relatives, whose control Ernesto resents. When he was thirteen, he spent a perfect summer reading the Arabian Nights. (Note: Fascination with the Arabian Nights is a trope of gay fiction.) He adopts leftist political views, partly out of conviction and partly to needle Wilder. He has his first sexual experiences on several occasions with a 28-year-old laborer identified as "the man". Their roles reflect classical models, with the older man insisting that since he has a beard he must be the active partner in intercourse. Ernesto also has one experience with a female prostitute. He imagines a different life for himself, perhaps as an adored concert violinist, though he lacks talent. His tentative approach to manhood is reflected in a visit to the barber where he has his first shave, though he hardly seems to need it. He becomes resentful about being overworked, though he refuses to share tasks with a younger assistant. He resents his employer and resigns his post with an insulting letter. Ending his employment will also end his casual encounters with "the man" at work. His mother succeeds in arranging for his employer to rehire Ernesto, who then reveals his sexual history to his mother to avoid taking up his clerk's post again.

That night Ernesto attends a violin recital and at intermission sees a beautiful boy a bit younger than himself but fails to locate him at the end of the concert. They meet by chance the next day, discovering they have the same violin teacher. "They could have been two puppies, who instead of wagging their tails were smiling at each other." Ernesto says he has just turned 17 and the other boy, Emilio called "Ilio", is 15 and a half and a more talented violin student than Ernesto. They decide to be friends.

== Composition and publication ==
Mindful of how his treatment of same-sex relations would offend most readers in Italy in the 1950s, Saba did not plan to publish this work. He wrote: "I knew as soon as I'd written the first sentence that this wouldn't be for publication." He allowed only a select few to read his manuscript. He read selections to other residents of the Roman asylum where he was living when he started writing in 1953. Still struggling against depression, he moved home to Trieste. When he shared a few pages by mail with his daughter Linuccia, he included "paranoid instructions" for protecting and returning the draft.

He planned to continue the story through Ernesto's adolescence to his discovery of poetry, which would be his life's work, and his first experience of love. When Saba completed four episodes, concluding with Ernesto's confession to his mother, he wrote a one-page explanation for the reader that interrupts the narrative. He titled it "Almost a Conclusion". He described his inability to continue writing: "Add to those pages, Ernesto's breakthrough to his true calling, and you would in fact, have the complete story of his adolescence. Unfortunately, the author is too old, too weary and embittered to summon up the strength to write all that." He wrote only a fifth episode that recounts the violin recital and the beginning of Ernesto's friendship with Ilio. In August 1953 he ordered the destruction of his manuscript and the novel was left unfinished at his death in 1957.

His daughter Linuccia arranged for its publication by Einaudi in 1975. Carcanet Press published an English translation by Mark Thompson in 1987, with a cover image in saturated colors of a woman walking along the seacoast taken from a painting by a Trieste artist. (Note: The upper half of the cover of the original Italian edition carries a charcoal sketch of the head of a young man resting on a pillow indicated by a single curved line. He gazes directly at the viewer.) It received wider distribution in 1989 in editions by Paladin in London and HarperCollins in New York. A New York Times critic noted that Saba's "forthrightness ... would certainly have raised eyebrows" in the 1950s but that "Anyone reading these scenes today, however, will probably find their sexually explicit content redeemed by the unfailingly affectionate tone." New York Review Books published a translation by Estelle Gilson in 2017. The Irish writer Aidan Higgins classed its treatment of adolescent sexuality with the work of an earlier generation of writers, E. M. Forster's Maurice and Thomas Mann's Death in Venice. He wrote: "The love that dare not speak its name here hardly bring itself to utter words above a whisper." Elsa Morante praised its handling of "innocent sensuality" in "this ideal boy".

Saba wrote in dialect and paid close attention to language and register as his characters navigate social relations using formal and informal terms of address between employer and clerk, clerk and laborer, senior and junior clerk, and even new teenage friends. Ernesto's mother speaks to him in proper Italian rather than local dialect, while Wilder prefers German and relies on Ernesto principally for his Italian-language correspondence.
