= Giorgio Fano =

Italian philosopher and linguist

- Born: April 17, 1885; Trieste, Austria-Hungary
- Died: September 20, 1963 (aged 78); Siena, Italy
- Citizenship: Italian
- Education: University of Padua
- Occupation: Professor of Philosophy
- Spouses: Maria Schönbeck (m. 1914–1928) Anna Fano (m. 1931–1963)
- Children: Mino Fano, Guido Fano
- Parents: Guglielmo Fano (father); Amalia Sanguinetti (mother)

Giorgio Fano (April 17, 1885 – September 20, 1963) was an Italian philosopher and linguist. He belonged to the school of Italian neo-idealist thinkers, among a group of artists and writers who made Trieste of the early Twentieth Century a notable center of intellectual activity. Fano read and interpreted the work of Benedetto Croce and Giovanni Gentile from an original point of view. In particular, he recognized the importance of the natural sciences and mathematics, which in his system are not pseudo-concepts. He also stressed the major importance of the simplest and most basic aspects of the life of mind, inspired by reflections of Gianbattista Vico.

== Biography ==
Giorgio Fano was born in Trieste on April 17, 1885. His father Guglielmo was a well-known physician, his mother Amalia Sanguinetti, who for many years was seriously ill, died when he was still a child. His father Guglielmo was one of the few Jews at the time who had converted to Catholicism out of sincere belief in the faith. But this conversion was, unfortunately, accompanied by religious delusions and mental disorders.

=== Youth and interaction with the Julian intellectuals ===
As an adolescent, Fano was rebellious against adult authority, detesting their conformity, their oppressive spirit and the ponderous atmosphere that enveloped them. In the novel "Quasi una fantasia" (Almost as a phantastic story) by Ettore Cantoni there is talk of two boys, in which it is easy to recognize the author Ettore and his friend Giorgio Fano, who travel and even arrive in Africa, precisely to escape the environment established by adults.

A rebellious boy, he refused to accept school discipline. In one notable episode typifying his character, he threw the class register into fire. He attended Austrian schools of the time, but with little benefit. One part of his difficulties was that he did not have a retentive memory. Although he excelled in understanding conceptual principles, he was deficient in retaining the numerous trivial details necessary in the study of history and geography. Thus, he left his studies long before he had achieved the matura (high school degree). Indeed Giorgio Voghera relates on Il Piccolo of January 4, 1995: "Retired” from school, his relatives got him a good office job. But he abandoned the job, without saying anything to anyone and rented, along with some peers, a small room on the hill of Scorcola. There he devoted himself not only to endless discussions with friends (and perhaps some amorous diversions) but also spent hours and hours reading, without any external guidance and while taking a large volume of notes, the classics of philosophy. Ill-fed, cold and often sleep-deprived—just fami . . . freddi o vigilie (hunger, cold and vigils), as Dante had expressed it. His in-depth study of the classics continued later in Vienna, where he could also attend the lectures of some academic luminaries of the time. It was his reading of the German classics, from Leibniz to Schopenhauer—and, in particular, Kant, Fichte and Hegel—which provided the basic orientation of his lifelong philosophical thinking. Even with the undoubted originality of his own oeuvre, he would retain this viewpoint throughout his lifetime. And we should not neglect the fact that his great fascination for the major exponents of German criticism and idealism provided him with conceptual weapons for his personal battle against the dogmatism, fideism, clericalism, inhabiting his own family environment. In any event, this young rebel, often reckless in his decisions concerning practical affairs, often unresponsive to people he did not like, showed from the outset, on matters of philosophical thought, a seriousness, a prudence, a desire to explore and document deep questions, to an extent which is rarely found even in mature scholars today."

The exceptionally stimulating environment of Trieste at the time also contributed to Fano's personal and intellectual maturation. In particular, he was friend of Umberto Poli, for whom he created the pseudonym “Saba.” In the above account by Giorgio Voghera also contains the following passage which describes the type of relationship that existed between Saba and Fano: "Fano was an incurable optimist, jovial and fearless; his jokes sometimes embarrassed Saba. His vision of the world was somehow transformed into something more beautiful and elevated, although he was often rather naïve. The following episode, known to be authentic, shows the kind of bold jokes Fano often subjected his friend. Young Fano and Saba are walking along the seashore, in an animated discussion about the existence of God. At one point Fano collects, and conceals in his closed fist, a piece of wood. He announces: "If God exists, let this stone float!" and then throws the piece of wood into the sea, in which it naturally remains afloat. Saba, very excited, thinking this might possibly be a miracle, brings his hand to the heart and exclaims breathlessly: "My God, Giorgio, Giorgio ..." "

The sixth of the "Prigioni" of Saba is also inspired by the figure of Fano:

The passionate. / Nature, because I burn, it has covered my cheeks and the red-haired chin. The spirit is not a breeze: it is a rushing wind, so even the Fate is shaken. /...../ I was Moses who brought you from Egypt, / and I suffered for you on the cross. / They call me in Arabia Muhammad.

Saba and Fano together bought the Ancient and Modern Library They did not regard it in the same way, while Saba was a lover of ancient books, Fano had a more indifferent outlook. Fano was not a person to diligently take on many "boring" tasks, but rather cheerfully consigned them to his companions. Ultimately, the two decided to separate, and leave the library to only one of them. Since both wanted to remain owners, Fano proposed a decision with a coin toss; Fano won. But Saba did not want to accept the verdict of fate and desperately begged his friend to leave him the Library; Fano eventually gave in. Another person from the Trieste area with whom Fano had a close friendship was Virgilio Giotti. Fano writes: "Our meeting was like that of a Tuscan artist with a Jewish prophet. I was very happy with it. At that time Giotti was reading Zola, Maupassant and Flaubert, works not familiar to Fano. Because of his indolent character, in many peripheral aspects of life he did what I advised him. He came away from Trieste, then he brought his family to Florence, and the like." But the friendship between the two suffered a tremendous trauma due to the tragic events involving Maria, sister of Virgilio Giotti, who Fano married in 1913. They had a mentally impaired son, who was later killed by his mother, who afterward committed suicide. This tragedy deeply shook the entire Trieste social community. He married a second time with Anna Curiel; together they had a son named Guido.

=== Studies and teachings ===
During the period of the First World War, Fano was irredentist, like many of his friends, Silvio Benco, Saba, Giotti, Carlo Schiffrer and others. Later his attitude was very similar to that of Benedetto Croce, and for similar ideological reasons. He did not espouse egalitarian ideals, which appeared to him as utopian and, in any case undesirable, possibly leading to a Communist society. Indeed, in the years immediately following the First World War, he firmly opposed the maximalist and turbulent socialism of that time. This resulted, for a very brief period, in some sympathy for Fascism. But this attitude changed very quickly, even before Croce. Giorgio Fano became a courageous and unconditional antifascist, who lost no opportunity to openly express his opinions. These position statements were not without consequences; in this regard we cite Treccani from the Biographical Dictionary:

Professor of Philosophy at various high schools in Trieste since 1925, Fano aspired, however, to university teaching, which encountered many obstacles imposed by the authorities. These difficulties were the result of his antifascist reputation, including a speech that he delivered commemorating his cousin Enrico Elia, a volunteer in the Great War who died in Podgora in 1915. In this speech he expressed, in a not very subtle way, the belief that the sacrifice of many lives for freedom was denied by the then dominant political regime. This political assertion earned him a few days in jail in the fortress of Koper and his reputation as an antifascist continued to have negative effects on his university career.

Fano graduated in philosophy cum laude from the University of Padua in 1923, with a thesis with the original title "Of the universe or of myself: essay of a solipsistic philosophy.” The thesis was published in 1926 in the Rivista d'Italia. He did not attend university classes in Padua, probably in part, because he was already married and had to provide for his family. In addition to Florence, a significant fraction of his university education was gained in Vienna, where he had spent a few years before the war, immersed in the environment of La Voce. Voghera writes "Of great maieutic skills [resembling the Socratic method of eliciting new ideas from others], it is no wonder that he was a teacher of particular value: the best I have ever known, I would dare to say. In Trieste he lectured for a few years in high schools, before moving to Rome. But some of my peers who had him as a teacher, never ceased to tell me the surprise they experienced when, after listening to Fano, suddenly realizing that philosophy—that indigestible jumble of empty, abstruse and complicated concepts—became something extremely fascinating and current, even fun. Needless to say, all the pupils were enthusiastic about him and almost all the schoolgirls were in love with him."

Fano was scholar of Croce, whom he had known since 1912; he published various articles on Croce's philosophy. One of these articles, entitled The Negation of Philosophy in Current Idealism (1932), brought him to the attention of Giuseppe Lombardo Radice, who offered him a position as voluntary pedagogical assistant at the Faculty of Magisterium of the Sapienza University of Rome. Thus, Fano moved there with his new family. The first book in which his thoughts were explicitly formulated: The Dialectical System of the Spirit appeared in 1937, when he was already 52 years old. In 1938, because of the racial laws then in effect, he was turned away from a university teaching position; he succeeded nevertheless in continuing as a professor at the Military School of Rome.

=== Later years and research on the origin of language ===
After the German invasion on September 8, 1943, Fano found refuge in Rocca di Mezzo in Abruzzo, where he remained for almost a year. His quiet serenity, courage and heedlessness of danger never failed him, although constantly faced with the risks of being discovered by the Germans (he and his wife had falsified their identity cards) and of the Allied bombing raids. Indeed, during the long winter of 1943–44, the Germans often relied on him as an interpreter. Since his house was right on the main road, the kitchen was often full of soldiers who needed something. There, in that poorly-heated kitchen, indifferent to the fearsome risks, he worked perhaps more diligently than ever before and completed an important work: The Philosophy of Croce. Essay of Criticism and Early Features of a Dialectical System of the Spirit, which was published in 1946. We recount here an episode that succinctly epitomizes both the importance that he attached to his work and his temerity and courage, one might almost call it his unconsciousness:

One morning, coming down into the kitchen, which had become his studio, he found it invaded by German soldiers who were looking for water and more. And then, with his usual calm demeanor, indifferent to the fact that he was a Jew, with the face of a biblical prophet, he pointed the Wehrmacht soldiers to the door: "Please," he said in German, "gentlemen, please, can you go somewhere else. I would have to work.” Without a word the soldiers pushed the door open and left, and Giorgio quietly went back to his work table to resume his arguments with Croce. He was quite fortunate that even a most superficial investigation would have been enough to convoy him with his family to the extermination camps."

When the war ended, he resumed his position at the University of Rome, and for a brief period he also held a temporary appointment as director of the Institute of Pedagogy of the Magisterium. However Fano did not ever bother to obtain any official appointment to an academic position, so that, when his academic career ended, he was not entitled to receive even a minimum pension. Notwithstanding, he had worked continuously for almost twenty years until his death, producing a number of highly relevant essays. In the aforementioned essay on Croce, he had advocated the importance of the empirical sciences, which in Croce's philosophy were ascribed no cognitive dignity. In the text Eastern Theosophy and Greek Philosophy, we find a description of the historical development of human thought, emphasizing the importance of mathematics, in contrast to Croce's claim that mathematics was merely a "pseudo-concept.”

His later research concerned the question regarding the origin of language. He contributed some significant original insights on the subject, as elaborated in his Essay on the Origins of Language; with a Critical History of the Glottogonic Doctrines. The essay was later expanded, following his intentions, into a more extensive exposition, the book Origins and Nature of Language by his wife Anna and son Guido.

He died in Siena on September 20, 1963, while presiding over a meeting of the Board of Examiners.

== Bibliography ==
- Atti del III congresso internazionale di estetica: Taken from "Edizioni della rivista di estetica", Venezia, 3-5 settembre (1956).
- Arte e linguaggio nel pensiero di Guido Calogero: Taken from "Fiera Letteraria" del 13 marzo (1955).
- Brevi conferenze e problemi di pedagogia a cura di A de Amicis e V. Marone: pp. 7, 21, 25, 35, 61, 91, Tipografia U. Quintily, Rome, - via Ennio Quirino Visconti, 78, (1946).
- Certificato dell'Università di Roma attestante la decadenza dall'abilitazione alla libera docenza di Giorgio Fano per ragioni razziali: (1970).
- Cibernetica e filosofia: Taken from "Giornale Critico della Filosofia Italiana", Fasc. 1 - (1964).
- Ciò che è vivo e ciò che è morto nella filosofia di Benedetto Croce: Taken from "Atti del XVI Congresso Nazionale di Filosofia", Bologna,(19-22 marzo 1953).
- Commento alla filosofia del Croce: Anno accad. 1946-47, Casa Editrice Fauno, Roma, (1946).
- Conferenza su l'idealismo ebraico, la rivoluzione russa, e la trilogia di Salom Asch "Pietroburgo-Varsavia- Mosca": (Manuscript) (1932).
- Conferenza tenuta a Trieste nel '25-'26 intorno al concetto della relatività: (Manuscript).
- [Corto] Trattato, Sul sistema dialettico del positivismo concreto:Beppe Grande Editore, Torino, (2007).
- Dell'universo ovvero di me stesso saggio di una filosofia solipsistica: Società Editrice "Unitas", Milano (1926).
- Estetica e Linguistica in Croce e dopo Croce: Taken from "De Homine" numero 11/12, Centro di ricerca per le scienze morali e sociali, Istituto di Filosofia della Università di Roma.
- Genio e disordine: (Manuscript).
- Il mio idealismo: in "AA. VV., La filosofia contemporanea in Italia: invito al dialogo", Asti, p. 14, (1958).
- Il problema dell'origine del linguaggio in G. B. Vico: Taken from "Giornale di metafisica" pp. 489–500, (1962).
- Il problema dell'origine e della natura del linguaggio nel "Cratilo" platonico: Taken from "Giornale di metafisica" pp. 307–320, (1962).
- Il sistema dialettico dello spirito(parte I, parte II): Servizi editoriali del GUF, Roma, (1937).
- I vantaggi delle dittature: (Manuscript).
- Indagini intorno all'origine ed alla essenza del linguaggio: "Il Ponte", pp. 90–105, 217–88, (1959).
- La contraddizione del concetto estetico nel sistema di B.Croce:"L'Anima", Firenze, Dicembre (1911).
- La filosofia del Croce (parte I, parte II, parte III, parte IV) : Saggi di critica e primi lineamenti di un sistema dialettico dello spirito, Istituto Editoriale Italiano, Milano, (1946).
- La filosofia di B.Croce,Saggio di critica e primi lineamenti di un sistema dialettico dello spirito: Taken froml fascicolo VI - anno IX - 1928 e dai fascicoli I e II - anno X - 1929 del Giornale critico della Filosofia italiana, Casa Editrice d'Arte Bestetti & Tumminelli, Milano- Roma.
- La metafisica ontologica di P.Carabellese, Giornale Critico della Filosofia Italiana: Taken from Fascicolo II-III Marzo-Giugno 1937 - Anno XVIII - Seconda Serie- Vol. V, G.C. Sansoni Editore, Firenze.
- La negazione della filosofia nell'idealismo attuale: Taken from "L'archivio di filosofia" Fasc. II. PP. 56–100, Aprile-Giugno (1932).
- La situazione anacronistica di P. Carabellese, ultimo dei grandi metafisici: "Giornate di studi carabellesiani", Atti del Convegno tenuto presso l'Istituto di Filosofia dell' Università di Bologna, ottobre, (1960).
- Le gesta di Dio e d'Israele trascritte dalla Bibbia a cura di Giorgio Fano: (Manuscript).
- Lettera al Prefetto di Trieste per ottenere l'ammissione all'esame di libera docenza negata per notizie riguardanti la condotta politica: (1936).
- Lettera di Giorgio Voghera a proposito delle persecuzioni politiche di cui è stato oggetto Giorgio Fano: (1987).
- Lezioni di storia della filosofia considerata nel suo svolgimento dialettico: Università degli studi di Roma, Facoltà di Magistero, Anno accademico 1947–48, Casa Editrice Fauno.
- L'influenza dell'idealismo ebraico sulla religiosità mondiale: Taken from "La Rassegna mensile di Israel" Vol. V - N. 12 (seconda serie) Aprile (1931).
- Matematici e filosofi: "Tecnica dell'insegnare, Rivista mensile di pedagogia e didattica", Anno III N.4 Roma, Aprile,(1948).
- Neopositivismo, analisi del linguaggio e cibernetica:Einaudi Editore, Torino, (1968).
- Note sul libro di Eugenio Garin "La filosofia come sapere storia": notes (Laterza 1959).
- Prolegomeni ad ogni futura metafisica: a cura di G.FANO, Istituto Editoriale Italiano, Milano (1948).
- Prolegomeni alla "Filosofia perenne", Osservazioni sulla Metafisica del Prof. Orestano: (Manuscript), Trieste (1933).
- Problemi teologici e problemi filosofici di Ferruccio Pardo:(Manuscript).
- Saggio sulle origini del linguaggio: Einaudi Editore, Torino (1962).
- Serietà scientifica e ciarlataneria nell'uso del simbolismo logico e dell'analisi del linguaggio: Taken from II volume de "La filosofia di fronte alle scienze", Milillo, Bari (1962).
- Teosofia orientale e filosofia greca, Preliminari ad ogni storiografia filosofica: La Nuova Italia, Firenze (1949).
- Totò e l'anello magico (con illustrazioni di Sergio Tofano):Editrice Fauno, Roma (1945), Einaudi Ragazzi (1994).
- Totò imperatore africano (con illustrazioni di Fabio Sansoni): Interlinea, Novara (2005).
- Un amoretto di mezza estate: (Manuscript).
- Una discussione indiana sull'idealismo: Taken from "Rivista di Filosofia" N.3, Milano, (1928).
- Verità e Storia, un dibattito sul metodo della storia della filosofia: Ed. Arethusa, Asti, (1956).
- Volontà umana e volontà divina nella storia, rileggendo "Guerra e Pace": (Manuscript).
