= Triestine dialect =

Venetian dialect of Trieste, italy

Triestine
- triestin
- A speaker of the Triestine dialect
- Native to: Italy; Slovenia; Croatia
- Region: Trieste and surrounding areas
- Native speakers: 200.000 - 300.000 (2006)
- Language family: Indo-European: Italic; Latino-Faliscan; Latin; Romance; Italo-Western; (unclassified); Venetian; Triestine
- Writing system: Latin

Language codes
- ISO 639-3: –
- Glottolog: trie1242

Triestine (Triestine: triestin, Italian: triestino, Slovene: tržaščina) is a dialect of Venetian spoken in the city of Trieste and the surrounding areas.

The lexicon of Triestine is mostly of Latin origin. However, there are also words taken from other languages. As Trieste borders with Slovenia and was under the Habsburg monarchy for almost six centuries, some words are of German and Slovene origin. Due to extensive immigration to the city in the late 18th and 19th centuries, some words also came from other languages, such as Greek and Serbo-Croatian.

== Development ==
After the expansion of the Republic of Venice, from the Middle Ages onwards, Venetian gradually asserted itself as a lingua franca in parts of the Eastern Mediterranean and in the Adriatic Sea, eventually replacing or strongly influencing several coastal languages such as the dialects of Trieste and Istria and also the Dalmatian dialects of Zara (Zadar) and Ragusa (Dubrovnik). In Trieste, this resulted in the gradual replacement of the former Tergestine dialect (related to Friulian within the Rhaetian subgroup of Romance languages) and of the neighbouring Slovene dialects by a Venetian-based language. This phenomenon began to take place first among fishermen and sailors, while the traditional bourgeoisie continued to speak Tergestine until the beginning of the 19th century. By that time, Tergestine was virtually a dead language, and the period of Modern Triestine had begun.

== Literature ==
Several prominent authors have used the Triestine dialect, such as Umberto Saba and Virgilio Giotti. Giotti, a prominent Triestine dialect poet, is credited as the greatest Triestine dialect poet.

== Example ==
Dialogue from Carpinteri e Faraguna. Noi delle vecchie provincie (Trieste, La Cittadella, 1971).

Triestine dialect:

Àle, àle, siora Nina, che el sol magna le ore!
No per vù, me par, sior Bortolo che sé qua sempre in gamba a contarne una roba e l'altra, tuto de tuti ... anca quel che se gavemo dismentigado...
Memoria, graziando Idio, no me ga mai mancado. Ma el mal xe che el sol magna le ore e le ore, pian pian, ne magna anca a nualtri!
Ma disème la sinzera verità: quanti ani gavé vù, sior Bortolo?
Indiferente. No conta i ani che se ga fato, conta quei che resta...

Italian:

Alé, alé, signora Nina, che il sole mangia le ore!
Non per Voi, mi pare, signor Bortolo che siete qui sempre in gamba a raccontarci una cosa e l'altra, tutto di tutti… anche quello che ci siamo dimenticati…
Di memoria, ringraziando Iddio, non me n'è mai mancata. Ma il male è che il sole mangia le ore e le ore, pian piano, mangiano anche noi!
Ma ditemi la sincera verità: quanti anni avete Voi, signor Bortolo?
Non importa. Non contano gli anni che si sono compiuti, contano quelli che restano…

== Sample vocabulary ==
Triestine	Venetian	Dalmatian	Italian	English
piròn (from the Greek πιρούνι-piroúni)	piròn	pirun	forchetta	fork
carèga (from the Greek καρέκλα-karékla)	cadréga	katriga	sedia	chair
scovàze	scoàsse	škovace	immondizia	rubbish
brisiòla	brisiòla	bržola	braciola di maiale, cotoletta	cutlet
mona (crazy person)	mona	mona	vagina / stupido	vagina / silly
impizàr	impissàr		accendere	to light
lugàniga	lugànega	luganige	salsiccia	sausage
spagnoléto	spagnoléto	španjulet	sigaretta	cigarette
