= Carlo Stuparich =

Italian writer, patriot & war hero (1894–1916)

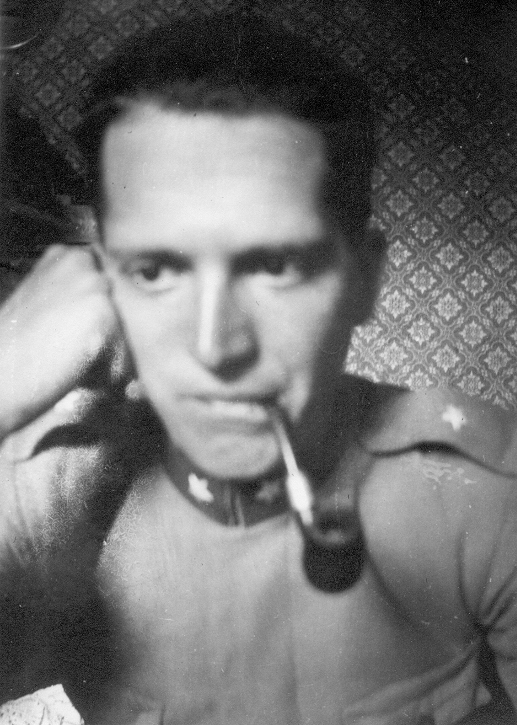
- Born: Carlo Stuparovich; 3 August 1894; Trieste, Austrian Littoral, Austrian Empire
- Died: 30 May 1916 (aged 21); Punto Corbin, Monte Cengio, Veneto, Italy
- Occupations: Author poet war hero
- Parents: Marco Stuparich (father); Gisella Gentili (mother)
- Relatives: his brother, Giovanni Stuparich (1891–1961)

Carlo Stuparich (3 August 1894 – 30 May 1916) was an Italian writer, patriot and war hero. His one substantive work was published only posthumously, on the initiative of his elder brother, Giovanni "Giani" Stuparich (1891–1961), another notable author. Admirers believe that, had he lived for longer, Carlo would have been remembered as the more accomplished and more original writer of the two. On 30 May 1916 Carlo Stuparich and the platoon he led, having become cut-off near Fort Corbin in the aftermath of a general retreat order some days earlier from higher up the chain of command, found themselves surrounded, outnumbered and overwhelmingly outgunned by the Austrian army under the command of Field Marshal von Hötzendorf. After a failed counter-attack in which his platoon had been wiped out, Carlo Stuparich committed suicide to avoid capture by the enemy.

Posthumously, he became a recipient of the coveted Gold Medal of Military Valour.

== Biography ==
=== Provenance and early years ===
Carlo Stuparich (born Carlo Stuparovich) was born in Trieste, a culturally vibrant and ethnically diverse port city which, before 1920, was still part of the Austrian Empire. Marco Stuparich, his father, came from a Dalmatian seafaring family that traced its provenance back to the island of Lussino. His mother, Gisella Gentili, came from a Trieste merchant family of Jewish origin. He had two recorded siblings, both older than he was. His brother Giani was three years older: his sister Bianca was two years older. Like his brother, he attended junior school and an Italian-speaking senior school in the city of their birth. Although their parents would not have considered themselves particularly wealthy, they saw to it that all three of their children received a solid education, especially in respect of culture and the arts. As a child Carlo became an accomplished violin player. His sister, a more than competent keyboard player, would accompany him on the piano. According to at least one source, while he was a teenager Carlo Stuparich's first love was not a girl, but music, primarily that of Bach. He took particular delight in playing the popular Bach chaconne. He also formed an attachment to the great literature fashionable at the time.

In or before 1913 Carlo Stuparich enrolled at the Istituto di Studi Superiori di Firenze, embarking on his university-level education in Florence, the city of Dante and of the newly revitalised Italian language. Although he had grown up in a family of mixed provenance and in a city which was part of the Austrian empire, the decision of Carlo Stuparich to follow his brother in moving to Florence for his university studies is seen by commentators as clear confirmation that in terms of the powerful nationalist currents of the times, his own commitment was to the recently formed Kingdom of Italy. From an Austrian perspective, Trieste was increasingly perceived as a focus for dangerous Itlain separatism within the empire, and it was certainly case that the Stuparich brothers were far from unique among the new generation of school graduates in choosing to complete their education in Florence. Another who made the same transition a few years earlier was Scipio Slataper, who became a close friend and mentor for Carol Stuparich.

At Florence many of the new generation of Italian literati formed close friendships which would mature into professional alliances and last a life time. Carlo Stuparich, by comparison, was not a great networker. In addition to his friendship with Slataper, during his time as a student at Florence her remained conspicuously close to his elder brother Giani, who had also managed to achieve a relatively nonconfrontational relationship with their father while the boys were growing up together in Trieste. Stuparich also joined with his brother and with Slataper in becoming both a regular contributor to the anti-establishment and increasingly influential literary journal "La Voce" and an adherent to the intellectual currents with which the magazine and its founder. Giuseppe Prezzolini were becoming associated.

=== War ===
In July 1914 the European nations beyond the Alps went to war. The Italian government resisted domestic and international pressures to become involved militarily, insisting that the country was totally unprepared for such a drastic development. There were also conflicting pressures over which side to back. The country was bound by long-established treaty commitments to fight alongside the Germans and the Austrians, and plenty of conservative traditionalist elements with links to the military backed the idea of doing so. On the liberal side of politics, however, and among many risorgimento patriots, fighting alongside the former imperial power against France, which was seen as a beacon of revolutionary enlightenment ideals, was an anathema. There was widespread awareness that without French support in the 1860s, Italian unification would almost not have been accomplished, even to the extent that it had been. For Italian speaking risorgimento patriots who had grown up in the Austrian Littoral region surrounding Trieste, liberation from colonial status was still an aspiration for the future. The British undertakings which induced the Italian government to intervene militarily against Austria in May 1915 remained highly secret till after the war ended, but had these details been known to them, the Stuparich brothers and their friend Scipio Slataper, as committed Italian irredentists from Trieste, would no doubt have welcomed the promises that their region would be transferred from Austria to Italy in the event of victory in the war by the French and their entente partners, the empires of Britain and Russia. Within less than two weeks of Italy's declaration of war against Austria, all three men volunteered and were accepted for military service in the First Grenadiers’ Regiment of the Royal Italian Army. By the time they enlisted the Stuparich had had the time to change the names on their identity documents to "Sartori". It was not a good time for Italian army volunteers to turn up at the frontline with family names that could lead to their being mistaken for deserters from the hated Austrian army.

On 2 June 1915 the Stuparich/Sartori brothers set off from Rome with the newly assembled squadron of which they were a part. Their destination was the operations zone surrounding Monfalcone. Carlo's immediate impressions on arrival were of disappointment. He was struck, like others, by the boredom of much of the army life. He was shocked that the regular soldiers with whom they joined up seemed to totally lacking in the hatred for the enemy forces that he believed would be necessary to achieve a military victory. Indeed, the mutual suspicion between the naive enthusiastic bloodlust of the newly arrived volunteers and the dulled disillusioned resignation of the soldiers who had been serving for a little longer and seen a little more became something of a theme during those early months of the war on Italy's northern front.

In May 1916 the two Stuparish brothers set off with their unit towards the "Val Sillà" on the side of "Monte Cengio" (Asiago Plateau ), not too far from the little mountain town of Tonezza del Cimone, on a ridge across to the far side of the valley. They were part of a larger mission to repel a major attack launched by the Austro-Hungarian armies under the leadership of Field Marshal von Hötzendorf against a defensive line held (till now) by the Italian First Army.

The Italian Chief of staff General Cadorna had not believed such a breakthrough by the Austrians possible due to the topographical challenges, and he hed continued to believe it impossible despite frequent reports during the first part of May of a huge massing of Austrian troops in preparation for it. The Austrian breakthrough reached the Asiago Plateau on 15 May 1916 and the little town of Asiago itself on 21 May 1916, following an intense and sustained artillery bombardment. It was also on 21 May that Cadorna ordered a general retreat by the Italian forces. Carlo Stuparich and his platoon had by this time become cut off from the rest of the Italian army, and were isolated near Fort Corbin. On 29 May 1916 a force of Austro-Hungarians, significantly larger in numbers than the small Italian platoon commanded by Stuparich, captured and consolidated their position on nearby "Punta Corbin" (the "Corbin promontory"). During the morning of 30 May 1916 launched a counter assault to recapture the strategic position. Four hours later they had been annihilated. Stuparich was still alive, but now committed suicide to avoid what seemed, otherwise, like certain capture by enemy forces.

=== Posthumous celebration ===
By the time the war ended in 1918 Carlo Stuparich had become something of a war hero among commentators and politicians on account of his actions on 30 May 1916. On 23 March 1919 he was posthumously awarded the Gold Medal of Military Valour. One of the 41 Italian war cemeteries in the area was named after him (even though his own body had been returned to his home city of Trieste for burial).

One of the many city squares in Milan has been renamed in honour of Carlo Stuparich and there is also a street in Rome that carries his name. In Trieste an entire schools complex is named to honour him. Other towns and cities with streets named after Carlo Stuparich include Roana, Mestre, Aviano and Genoa. In Vicenza there is a street named after the Stuparich brothers.

== Works ==
The book "Cose e ombre di uno", was published by "Editore la Voce", the publishing house attached to the magazine for which Stuparich had written before the war, and it comprised a collection of "thoughts, poetry and letters", with an introduction by Giani Stuparich, the author's brother. It was republished, over the years, by a succession of different publishing houses, most notably in 1933, 1968 (with a new introduction by Giani Stuparich and an appendix consisting of hitherto unpublished works), 2001 and 2006. Letters from Carlo Stuparich are also included during the twentieth century in a number of other published volumes of correspondence.
