= Giani Stuparich =

Italian writer

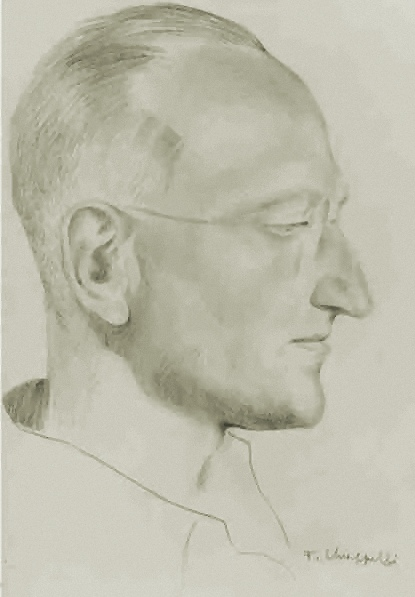
- Portrait of Giani Stuparich by Francesco Chiappelli
- Born: 4 April 1891; Trieste, Austria-Hungary
- Died: 7 April 1961 (aged 70); Rome, Italy
- Education: Charles University; University of Florence
- Occupation: Writer
- Relatives: Carlo Stuparich (brother)

Olympic medal record

Art competitions
| Gold medal – first place | 1948 London | Epic works |

Giani Stuparich (April 4, 1891 – April 7, 1961) was an Italian writer. He was born in Trieste, then in the Austrian-Hungarian Empire. In 1948 he won a gold medal in the art competitions of the Olympic Games for his "La Grotta" ("The Cave").

== Biography ==
Giani Stuparich was born in Trieste on April 4, 1891 to a family of Jewish origins. He studied briefly at Charles University in Prague (1913), then moved to Florence, where he took a degree in literature (1915), and befriended Scipio Slataper. After university, he began to write for the literary magazine La Voce. He and his brother Carlo Stuparich were volunteers in World War I. He later published a terse war diary, Guerra del '15 (1931), and a choral novel, Ritorneranno (1941), based on his experiences. A schoolteacher for many years, he was opposed to Fascism and during World War II was arrested and deported for his presumed Judaism. In the 1940s he was romantically attached to the clothing designer and publisher, Anita Pittoni.

== Works ==
As well as auto-biographical memoirs, notably Trieste nei miei ricordi (1948), Stuparich wrote stories and short novels, one of the most successful being L'isola (1942), which focuses on a tragic father-son relationship. Simone (1953), his last novel, is a highly literary foray into fantasy.

== Sources ==
- Benussi, Cristina (2019). "STUPARICH, Giani". Dizionario Biografico degli Italiani (in Italian). Vol. 94: Stampa–Tarantelli. Rome: Istituto dell'Enciclopedia Italiana. ISBN 978-88-12-00032-6.
