= Virgilio Giotti =

Italian poet (1885–1957)

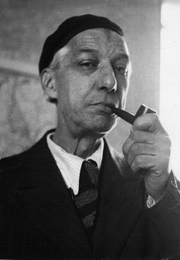
- Portrait of Giotti
- Born: Virgil Schönbeck; 15 January 1885; Trieste, Austrian Empire (present-day Italy)
- Died: 21 September 1957 (aged 72); Trieste, Italy
- Occupations: Poet, short story writer
- Spouse: Nina Schekotoff (m. 1936; 3 children)
- Writing career
- Notable works: Lyrics and Idylls; Colori
- Notable awards: Feltrinelli Prize

Virgil Schönbeck (15 January 1885 – 21 September 1957), known by his pen name Virgilio Giotti, was an Italian poet writing both in Italian and in the Triestine dialect. Giotti's poetry "which is not so much linked to the vernacular tradition as to contemporary poetry in the Italian language, from Pascoli and the Crepuscolari to hermeticism, uses the dialect to give more intimate vibration to its lyrical motifs, now inspired by a loving or familiar, serene or painful intimacy, now by nature, by the landscape, by the minute life of his city; in forms that from the musicality of the canzonetta approach more and more, and with ever greater grace, an epigrammatic essentiality."

He has been credited as one of the great Italian poets of the 20th century, and is regarded as the greatest Triestine dialect poet.

== Biography ==
He was born in Trieste, at the time still part of the Austro-Hungarian Empire, on 15 January 1885, the son of Riccardo Schönbeck, a native of Kolín, Bohemia, of German descent, and Emilia Ghiotto, a Venetian, from whose surname he derived his pseudonym. In 1907 he moved with his family to Florence to escape the Hapsburg draft and for several years was a commercial traveler, mainly travelling to Switzerland. In 1912 he met the Muscovite noblewoman Nina Schekotoff, who soon became his partner and with whom he had three children: little Tanda (Natalia), and Paolo and Franco.

In 1914 he published in Florence the collection of poems Little songbook in the Triestine dialect, which was to be followed by Caprizzi, Canzonete e Stòrie published in the 1928 edition of Solaria, Colori, published in 1941, Sera in 1946, Versi in 1953.

In May 1919 he returned to Trieste, opening a small newsagent selling newspapers and books. He published prose and above all poetry for many magazines, including Solaria, Riviera Ligure, Circoli, L'Italia letteraria, Lirica, and Letteratura. He later had a job at the Lega nazionale, as an inspector of kindergartens in Istria and the Karst. Giotti was a skillful painter, and during this period produced many drawings. He also produced his Caprizzi canzonete e stòrie and was reported by his friend Roberto Bazlen to Eugenio Montale, who reviewed his book, emphasizing his qualities of "elegiac landscapist" and observer, and comparing him to Salvatore Di Giacomo. After the suppression of the Lega nazionale, Giotti was an employee at the Comune di Trieste, and later at the Maggiore Hospital in Trieste, where he worked until the end of his life. In the 1920s his daughter Tanda married the antifascist Emilio Quarantotto, with whom she had a daughter, Vittorina, and followed her husband to the Tremiti Islands and to Chiaromonte. His other son Paolo started military service in 1937 but was accused of antifascism and sent to the Tremiti Islands for a year of internment, which was a hard blow for Giotti, although his son was released in 1938 for good behavior. Giotti, who in 1941 lost his mother Emilia, worked so that his son Paolo may set out to the Eastern front to act as an interpreter. His son did depart in February 1942, and his brother Franco followed him in December. Both his sons were captured, and died in January 1943. Giotti kept hoping until January 1946, when the news of Paolo's death finally reached him. Thereafter, keeping his sobriety and lucidity, he started writing a diary which was published posthumously as Appunti inutili, published with an introduction by Stuparich in 1959.

He was a longtime friend of Umberto Saba, for whom he designed the logo of the Libreria Antica e Moderna and cured and illustrated the plaquette of Cose leggere e vaganti, and helped in the formation of philosopher Giorgio Fano, who married his sister Maria. However, when Giorgio left his sister for the writer Anna Curiel, Maria committed suicide, taking her sick child with her. Facing such tragedies, Giotti always kept a calm and sober attitude. He didn't share Saba's passion for psychoanalysis, and his relationship with Saba deteriorated during the 1930s, up to when they even avoided to meet.

He was also the author of delicate poems in the Italian language, such as Lyrics and Idylls published in the 1931 edition of Solaria, of the aforementioned private diary Appunti inutili, and of some short stories; in 1946 he translated the poet Esenin's A Letter to Mother from Russian into Italian. In 1937 the critic Pietro Pancrazi dedicated an article to the poet from Trieste in the Corriere della Sera. Pancrazi, in his Giotti poeta triestino, put him among the great poets of the century, calling his dialectical poetry écriture d'artiste. Other prominent critics, such as Natalino Sapegno, Cesare Segre, Gianfranco Contini wrote positively about him. In the essay Poesia di Giotti published by Mario Fubini on Il ponte in November 1948, he was acknowledged as the greatest among the poets writing in dialect. He was consecrated as such by Pier Paolo Pasolini, first in the anthology Poesia dialettale del Novecento (1952), and then in a memorable conference in 1956, later published in Paragone.

== Poetry ==
The first verses of Giotti were influenced by Pascoli, Gozzano and the Crepuscolari, both in the style and in the themes; starting from Caprizzi, Canzonete and Stòrie the melodic motifs dominate in his verses, which will bring him closer to Di Giacomo and to some production of Saba.

Giotti's dialect is a dialect which, while remaining natural, is not vernacular but intellectualistic and seems to contrast with the character of its themes linked to the daily life of a quite internalized Trieste. Unlike Svevo and Saba, Giotti's Trieste is not the Habsburg port of Central Europe but rather a simple picture of affections and people: its "Triestinity", alien to the search for the picturesque and folkloric, lies in the use of the dialect and in the setting, background for poetry of high lyrical tension.

In his verses the quatrain of partially rhythmic hendecasyllables with typical metric inversions prevails (Dei purziteri, / ne le vetrine) which make the syntactic- rhythmic figures well balanced (le feste / de Pasqua xe vignude, e vignù xe / l'istà). Typical of Giotti is also the use of enjambement, especially in the second collection, which divides not only the syntactic groups between strophe and strophe or between verse and verse, but also the same word into two parts (veda- / rò"; "de con- / tentezze). The punctuation is very dense and analytical. A more colloquial agreement between syntax and meter is found in the last collection, closer to certain verses of Saba, where the hendecasyllable becomes discursive and elegiac.

== Works ==
- Piccolo canzoniere in dialetto triestino, Gonnelli, Florence 1914
- Caprizzi, Canzonete e Stòrie, Edizioni di "Solaria", Florence 1928
- Colori (silloge delle sue liriche), Florence, Parenti, 1941; Padua, Le Tre Venezie, 1943; Milan-Naples, Ricciardi, 1957; Milan, Longanesi, 1972 (con l'incorporazione delle Poesie per Carlotta, scritte nel 1949); Turin, Einaudi, 1992, a cura di Anna Modena (anche questa edizione è comprensiva delle Poesie per Carlotta)
- Sera, Edizione privata, Trieste 1946; Turin, De Silva, 1948
- Versi, Edizioni dello Zibaldone, Trieste 1953
- Appunti inutili, Edizioni dello Zibaldone, Trieste 1959
- Kleine Töne Meine Töne/ Pice Note Mie Note. Gedichte/Poesie.Unnötige Notizen/Appunti inutili. Transl.by Hans RAIMUND: Drava Verlag 2013

== Bibliography ==
- Giuseppe Citanna, La poesia del Giotti, in «Pagine istriane», VII, 26-27, 1956, pp. 19–28.
- Celebrazione di Virgilio Giotti, discorsi di Biagio Marin e Alfonso Gatto, Trieste, Circolo della cultura e delle arti, 1959.
- Anna Modena, Virgilio Giotti, Pordenone, Studio Tesi, 1992.
- Mauro Caselli, Il canto di Hestia: appunti su Virgilio Giotti, in «Tratti», n. 59, 2002, pp. 73–86
- Mauro Caselli, Biavo zeleste. Su Marin e Giotti, in «Studi mariniani», 2002, pp. 53–65.
- Mauro Caselli, Il femminile in Giotti, in Il banco di lettura, n. 26, 2003, pp. 13–22.
- Mauro Caselli, La voce bianca: su Virgilio Giotti, Udine, Campanotto editore, 2004.
- Mauro Caselli, Il qualunque altro: intorno ad una poesia di Virgilio Giotti, in «Tratti», n. 72, 2006, pp. 94–96.
- Mauro Caselli, In seconda persona: identità e trascendenza in Virgilio Giotti, in Si pesa dopo morto: atti del convegno internazionale di studi per il cinquantenario della scomparsa di Umberto Saba e Virgilio Giotti, Trieste 25-26 ottobre 2007, in «Rivista di letteratura italiana», n.26, 2008, pp. 305–307.
- Paolo Senna, Le cose viste. Per un'analisi dei "Racconti" di Virgilio Giotti, «Rivista di letteratura italiana», XXVI, 2008, n. 1, pp. 187–190.
- Paolo Senna, Virgilio Giotti tra "idealizzazione poetica" e lingua della prosa (1920-1926), in "Otto/Novecento", a. 2014, n. 1, pp. 149–159
- Lorenzo Tommasini, a cura di, Virgilio Giotti poeta e triestino, Centro studi Scipio Slataper, Trieste 2018, con contributi di R. Benedetti, G. Cimador, M. Menato, A. Modena, F. Senardi, L. Tommasini, S. Volpato, L. Zorzenon, ISBN 978-88-941961-2-2.
- Hans Raimund: Virgilio Giotti/ Übersetzen und Veröffentlichen fremdsprachiger Lyrik.In: NEIGUNGEN. Löcker Verlag/Wien 2019. ISBN 978-3-85409-983-3
