= Umberto Saba =

Italian poet and novelist (1883–1957)

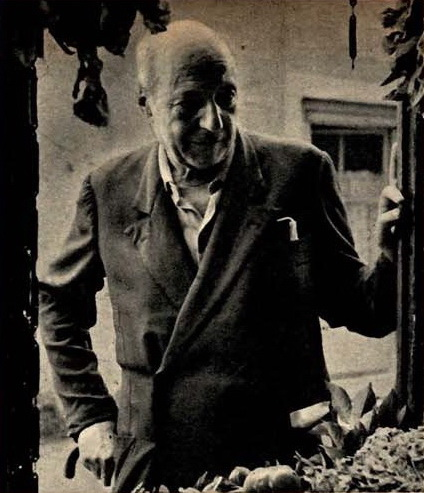
- Umberto Saba, 1951
- Born: Umberto Poli; 9 March 1883; Trieste, Austria-Hungary
- Died: 25 August 1957 (aged 74); Gorizia, Italy
- Occupations: Novelist, poet
- Spouse: Carolina (Lina) Wölfler (m. 1909–1956; 1 child)
- Writing career
- Language: Italian
- Genres: Fiction, poetry
- Movement: Antinovecentismo

Umberto Saba (9 March 1883 – 25 August 1957) was an Italian poet and novelist, born Umberto Poli in the cosmopolitan Mediterranean port of Trieste when it was the fourth largest city of the Austro-Hungarian Empire. Poli assumed the pen name "Saba" in 1910, and his name was officially changed to Umberto Saba in 1928. From 1919 he was the proprietor of an antiquarian bookshop in Trieste. He suffered from depression for all of his adult life.

== Life and career ==
Saba's Christian father, 29-year-old Ugo Edoardo Poli, converted to Judaism in order to marry 37-year-old Felicita Rachele Cohen in July 1882. Felicita was one month pregnant with Umberto at the time of the wedding. Ugo abandoned his new wife and faith before Umberto was born and the child was raised first by a Slovene Catholic wet-nurse, Gioseffa Gabrovich Schobar ("Peppa"), and her husband, who had just lost a child, and from 1887 onwards by his mother, in her sister Regina's home, though Umberto maintained a close lifelong attachment to Peppa. ^{(p. 528)}

Saba as a child

Saba was a keen reader who kept pet birds and studied the violin. ^{(pp. xix, 528)} In 1897 he transferred from the Gymnasium to a commercial college, the Imperial Academy of Commerce and Navigation, and then went to work in the office of a customs agent.

As a young man, he was of a shy and solitary character, with just a few friends, among whom were his cousin Giorgio Fano and Triestine poet Virgilio Giotti.

In 1900 he began composing poetry, signing his work "Umberto Chopin Poli." In January 1903 Saba travelled to Pisa to study archaeology, German and Latin, but began to complain of a nervous disorder and, in June, returned to Trieste. After a holiday in Slovenia, he spent some time later that year in Switzerland, writing a play. In July 1904, the socialist newspaper, Il Lavoratore, edited by his friend Amadeo Tedeschi, published Saba's account of a visit to Montenegro earlier in the year, and in May 1905, Il Lavoratore printed his first published poem. In 1905 he travelled to Florence with friends and – upon meeting his father for the first time – changed his pen name to "Umberto da Montereale," after the town of his father's birth. That summer he met Carolina (Lina) Wölfler, and began corresponding with her the following December. Between 1907 and 1908 he completed an obligatory year of Italian military service in an infantry unit based in Salerno. He married Lina in a Jewish ceremony in 1909, and they had a daughter, Linuccia, the following year. ^{(p. xix)}

In November 1910 his first collection of poems, Poesie, was published under the name Saba, and the name was legally recognised as his surname in 1928. ^{(p. xix)}. This choice of name (which may be based on one of two Hebrew words – "sova" (שובע) meaning "being well-fed" or "saba" (סבא) meaning "grandfather") is thought by some scholars to be a homage to his Jewish mother, while others point to the similarity with his wet nurse's surname, Schobar.

In the spring of 1911, while Saba was away in Florence meeting people associated with the influential magazine La Voce, and initiating a collaboration with Mario Novaro, Lina had an affair with a painter. The couple separated, but were together again by May 1912 when the family moved to Bologna, where public readings of his poetry were poorly received and Saba was beset by depressed lows and creative highs. Destitute, in 1914 the family moved to Milan, where Saba found work first as a secretary, then as a nightclub manager. In early 1915 he began writing for Benito Mussolini's Il Popolo d'Italia newspaper, but in June was drafted into the army, where he saw no active service and was hospitalised due to depression. ^{(pp. 544–5)}

In 1919, he returned to Trieste and purchased the Mailänder second-hand bookshop, which he renamed La Libreria Antica e Moderna. The business produced enough income to support the family, and Saba soon became enthusiastic about buying and selling rare old books and enjoyed the extensive travel involved. After both returned to Trieste in 1919, Saba started meeting on a daily basis and collaborating artistically with Giotti, who designed for him the logo of the Libreria Antica e Moderna, edited and illustrated the plaquette for Saba's Cose leggere e vaganti and of ten small books. Saba on the other hand published Il mio cuore e la mia casa at his library. After the death of Giotti's sister in 1929, his friendship with Saba deteriorated in the 1930s, up to the point when the two even avoided meeting.

He self-published the first edition of his Songbook in 1921 (successive, enlarged editions followed, and eventually it grew to contain over four hundred poems, spanning fifty years). ^{(p. 544–5)} In 1929 he began psychoanalysis under the influential Trieste psychoanalyst Edoardo Weiss, a student of Freud. ^{(p. xxi)}

Saba (left) receiving his honorary doctorate from the University of Rome in 1953

In 1939 Saba sought exemption from the newly proclaimed anti-Jewish laws, but was unwilling to be baptised into the Catholic faith, so the following year he sold the bookshop to his long-time assistant and friend, Carlo Cerne. Upon the announcement of the armistice between Italy and Allied armed forces in 1943, Saba fled Trieste with his family to Florence, where they moved to eleven different hiding places over the following 12 months, to avoid deportation; after which Lina returned to Trieste and Saba moved to Rome, where he oversaw the publication of Scorciatoie e raccontini, a collection of his aphorisms. In 1946 Saba was awarded the Viareggio Prize and returned to Trieste where, in the following year, he sparked a vitriolic debate over the future of the city with his article If I were named governor of Trieste.

After being prescribed injectable opium for his depression, from 1950 onwards Saba was frequently admitted to a Rome nursing home for treatment of addiction. At the age of 70, in 1953, the University of Rome bestowed upon him an honorary doctorate, and he received an award from the Lincean Academy. He died at the age of 74 in Gorizia, nine months after a heart attack, and a year after the death of his wife.

== Influence of Jewish background ==
The 1948 prose essay "Storia e cronistoria del Canzoniere" ("History and chronology of song-writing") shows autobiographical elements. "Gli Ebrei" (The Jews) which is part of his 1956 "Ricordi-Racconti 1910–1947" ("Records and Stories 1910–1947") describes the life of the Trieste Jewish Community of his childhood. The 1952 "Vignette di vita giudaica" ("Vignettes of Jewish life") includes a description of Samuel David Luzzatto, his mother's uncle on her own mother's side. His works indicate his knowledge of both Hebrew and the Trieste Jewish dialect.

== Works ==
- Poems (1911)
- With My Eyes (1912)
- What Remains for Poets To Do (1912)
- Songbook (1921)
- Prelude and Songs (1923)
- Autobiography (1924)
- The Prisoners 1924
- Figures and Songs (1926)
- Prelude and Flight (1928)
- Words (1934)
- A Small Town Team (1939)
- Last Things (1944)
- Mediterranean (1947)
- Scorciatoie e raccontini (1946)
- Birds – Nearly a Story (1951)
- Ernesto (written 1953, published 1975)

== Bibliography ==
Italian editions:

- Tutte le poesie, ed. A Stara, Milano, Mondadori, 1988
- Tutte le prose, ed. A. Stara, Milano, Mondadori, 2001
- Prose, ed. L. Saba, Milano, Mondadori, 1964

English translations:

- Umberto Saba: the Collection of Poems. Umberto Saba's Poetry Translated in English, translated by A. Baruffi, Philadelphia, PA, LiteraryJoint Press, 2020, IBAN 978-1-67818-520-6.
- The Poems of Trieste and Five Poems for the Game of Soccer: A Selection of the Best Poetry by Italian Master Umberto Saba, Translated in English, translated by A. Baruffi, Philadelphia, PA, LiteraryJoint Press, 2016, IBAN 978-1-365-35818-0
- Thirty-one Poems, trans. F. Stefanile, New York, The Elizabeth Press, 1978/ Manchester, Carcanet, 1980
- Ernesto, trans. M. Thompson, New York, Carcanet, 1987
- The Stories and Recollections, trans. E. Gilson, New York, Sheep Meadow Press, 1993
- History and Chronicle of the Songbook, trans. S. Sartarelli, New York, The Sheep Meadow Press, 1998
- Song-book: Selected Poems from the Canzoniere of U. S., New York, The Sheep Meadow Press, 1998
- Poetry and Prose, trans. with commentary, V. Moleta, Bridgetown, Aeolian Press, 2004
- ′′ Songbook, The Selected Poems of Umberto Saba ′′ translated by George Hochfield and Leonard Nathan, Yale University Press, 2008. Paperback edition, 2011.

Studies:

- La gallina di Saba, M. Lavagetto, Torino, Einaudi, 1989
- Gli umani amori. La tematica omoerotica nell'opera di Umberto Saba, M. Jattoni Dall'Asén, Reading, The Italianist, n.1, 2004
