= Carlo Wostry =

Italian painter and illustrator

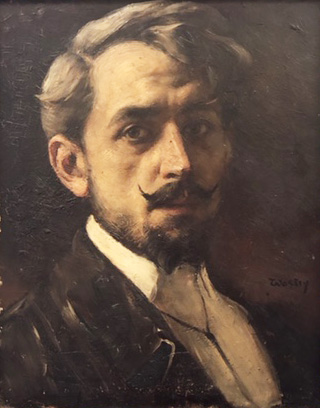
Self-portrait (1907)

Carlo Wostry (18 February 1865 – 10 March 1943) was an Italian painter and illustrator.

== Youth and early career ==
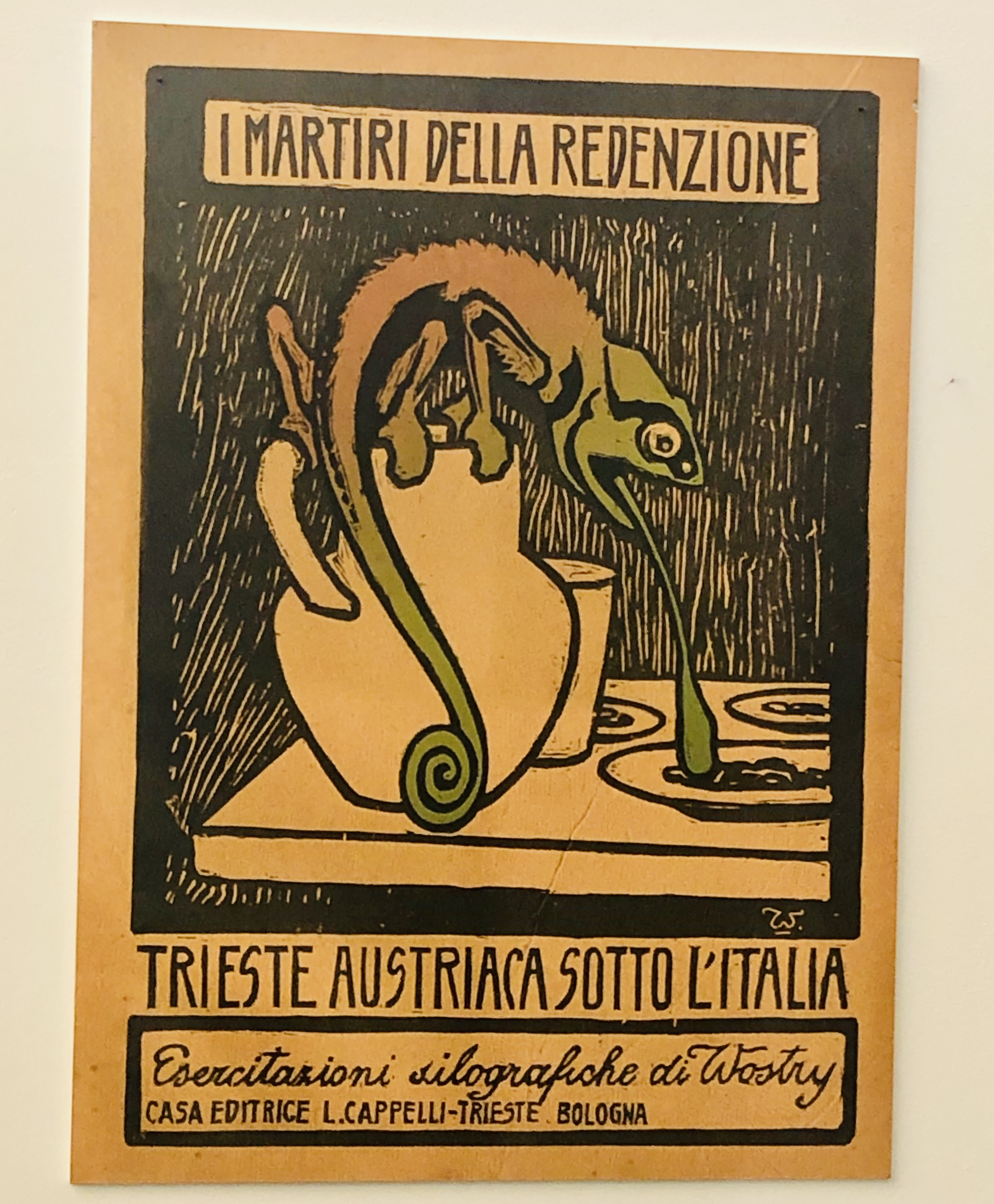
Cover of The Martyrs of the Redemption

Carlo Wostry was born in Trieste. He was the son of Ferdinando Wostry and Virginia Artelli. From 1882 to 1885 he studied art at the Academy of Fine Arts Vienna. He then went on to study at the Academy of Fine Arts, Munich and befriended the painter Umberto Veruda. After his return to Trieste in 1887, the 22-year-old Wostry created his first major work, Via Crucis (Stations of the Cross), that was later acquired by the Jesuit church of Church of Santa Maria Maggiore, Trieste.

In 1887 he received a scholarship for a two-year stay in Rome, but poor health prevented him from taking it up. He later travelled to Barcelona, Budapest and Russia, where his interest in orientalism was awakened.

In 1896 he moved to Paris. for seven years he remained there, illustrating numerous publications and writing some articles, including some for Le Figaro. In 1897 he painted Christ and Mary Magdalene for Saint-Roch, Paris; he followed this in 1900 with the Martyrdom of St. Justus for Trieste Cathedral. During a brief stay in London in 1902 his painting drew inspiration from the English masters of the 18th century. His most important work of this period is Scena Boschereccia, that hangs today in the Revoltella Museum in Trieste. Returning to France, he spent time in Trouville-sur-Mer and Deauville as well as Paris. After Wostry returned to Trieste, he created on various works which were shown at international exhibitions such as the Biennale di Venezia (1907, 1910, 1920, 1922, 1924 and 1925). From 1916 he taught art at the Istituto Industriale in Trieste.

He was an enthusiastic irredentist. In 1916, shortly after Italy entered the First World War he designed a medallion to commemorate the hoped-for future integration of Trieste with Italy. This was then hidden inside a sculpture of Penthesilea he was working on so that when the Austrian authorities searched his studio, they found nothing. When Austria-Hungary collapsed on 30 October 1918 he and his friend Sofianopulo ran up the hill to Trieste Cathedral, gained entry to the bell tower and rang the bells in celebration. He also published a series of satirical prints entitled The Martyrs of the Redemption: Austrian Trieste Under Italy.

== Later career ==
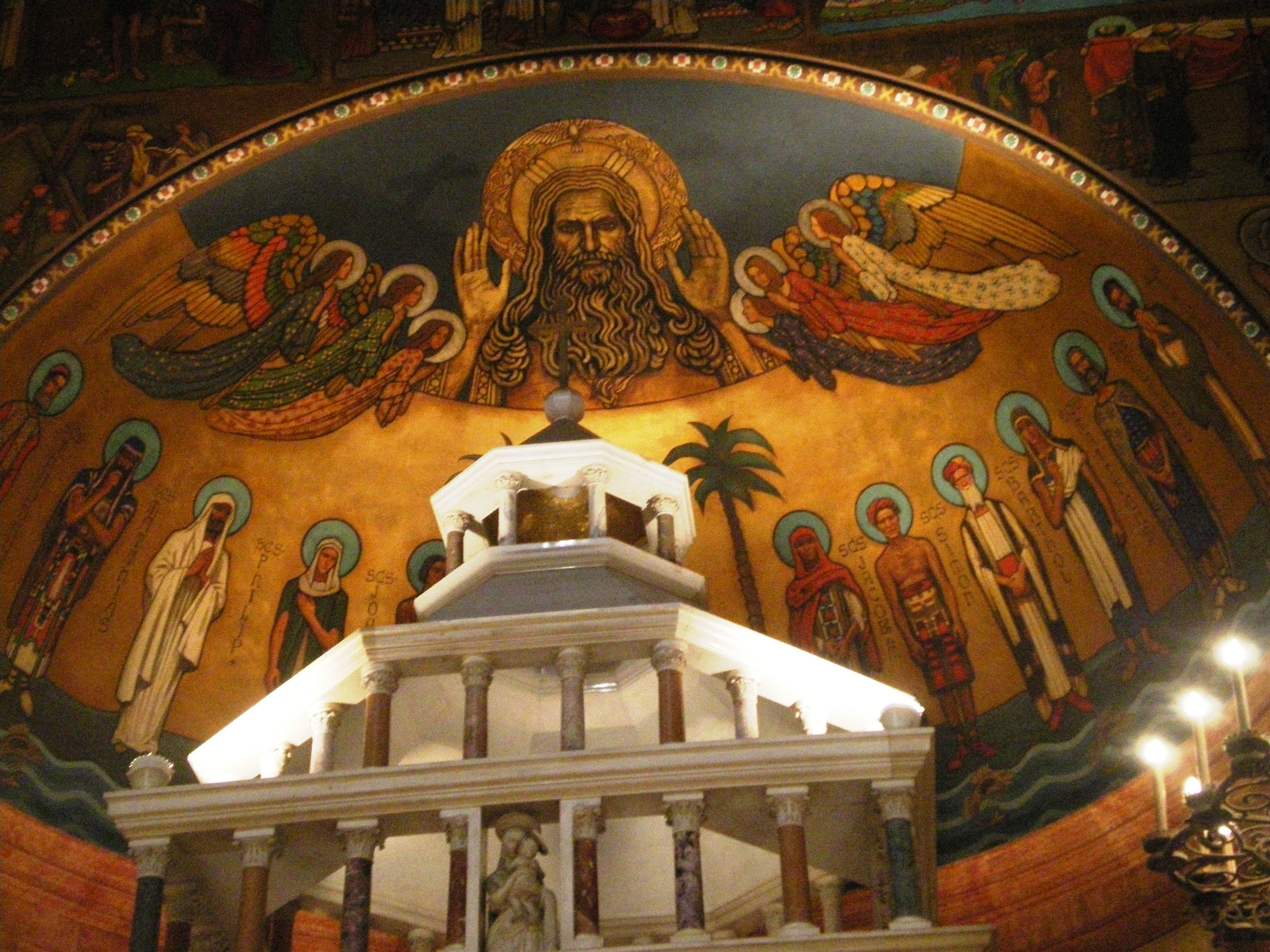
Apse of St. Andrew's Church in Pasadena, California

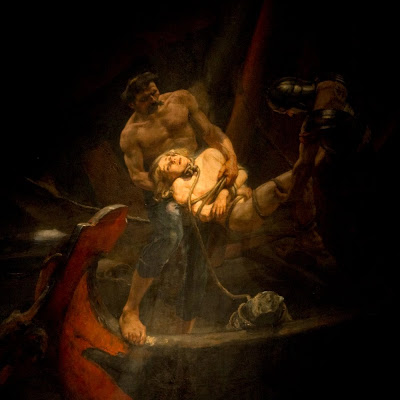
The Martyrdom of St. Justus

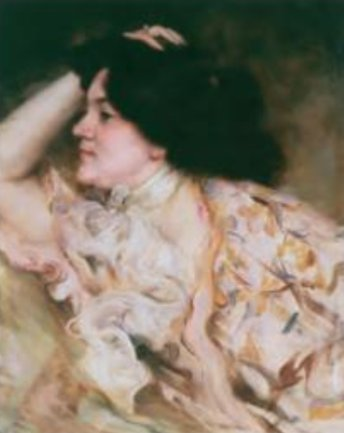
The painter, Erma Bossi

After the First World War he became more preoccupied with religious themes in his work, and created pieces for Saint-Vincent-de-Paul, Paris, Trieste Cathedral, Sant'Antonio Nuovo in Trieste as well as the Basilica of San Francesco, Ravenna.

In 1926 he travelled to the United States where he worked in New York, San Francisco, Los Angeles and Miami. In 1930 Wostry was commissioned to work on St. Andrew's Church in Pasadena, and this was to become one of his most important projects. Originally commissioned only to make a mural for the apse, his clients were however so enthusiastic about his work that they entrusted to him the decoration of a side chapel and in 1932 with the representation of the Stations of the Cross. At the same time as he was working in the church, he was also commissioned to create murals for the home of Coralie Fitzharris-Milburn, also in Pasadena. Wostry returned to Trieste, where he prepared the 24 panels for the project, which were shipped to Pasadena in 1935.

In 1937 Wostry suddenly returned to Trieste, where he died on 10 March 1943.

== Selected works ==
=== Painting ===
- Stations of the Cross, Church of Santa Maria Maggiore, Trieste, 1887
- Portrait of Pietro Sartorio, Museo Sartorio, Trieste, 1888
- Parco di villa Sartorio di Monebello, Museo Sartorio, Trieste
- Il sonno, Civici Musei di Storia ed Arte, Trieste
- Christ and Mary Magdalene, Saint-Roch, Paris, 1897
- Martyrdom of St. Justus, Trieste Cathedral, 1900
- Portrait of Erma Bossi
- Scena Boschereccia, Museo Revoltella, Trieste, 1902
- The Stations of the Cross, St. Andrew's Catholic Church, Pasadena, 1935

=== Books ===
- Carlo Wostry (1934): Storia del circolo artistico di Trieste, Udine.
