= Isidoro Grünhut =

Austrian painter (1862–1896)

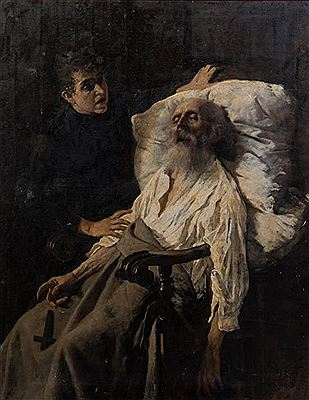
The Dying Man, 1887

Isidoro Grünhut (27 August 1862 – 5 May 1896) was an Austrian painter known for genre scenes and portraits.

== Biography ==
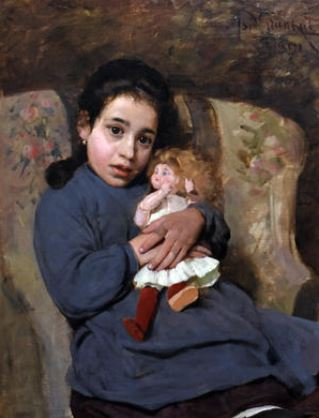
The Doll, 1891

He was born in Trieste of Jewish ancestry. His father, Israel, was originally from Regensburg. His mother, Giuditta née Panzieri, was from an upper-class family in Ancona. He displayed artistic talent at an early age, but his father was opposed to his pursuit of that as a career. At the age of sixteen, he rebelled, running away from home to join up with an "impresario" named Benelli; providing drawings in return for his upkeep. The constant travelling, long hours and poor food undermined his already precarious health; having suffered a childhood fall that damaged his back. He eventually developed a chronic heart condition, and was forced to quit.

Around 1880, after a brief stay in Trieste, he was able to enroll at the Accademia di Belle Arti di Venezia, where he studied with Pompeo Marino Molmenti. After two years, he transferred to the Academy of Fine Arts, Munich. There, he met two other students from Trieste; Carlo Wostry and Umberto Veruda, whose recollections provide much of what is known about him up to this period. In 1884, new health problems forced him to quit attending school and work as an itinerant portrait painter. He left Munich in 1886 and returned to Trieste.

In 1888, he participated in a competition in Bologna, but was denied a prize because he lacked Italian citizenship; Trieste being part of Austria-Hungary at that time. He was also rejected for a scholarship that would have allowed him to study in Rome, but was able to gain financial support from Baron Giuseppe Morpurgo (1816–1898), head curator at the Museo Revoltella.

While in Rome, he was able to attract a permanent patron, Count Alessandro Lotteringhi della Stufa, who offered him room to set up a studio at the family palace in Florence. There, he gained numerous clients among the aristocracy, but much of his work from that time is unknown, as it remains in private collections. He left there in 1891, to travel, although he went back occasionally, and returned in 1893. During this period, he painted little, focusing on caricatures, and lived a very disorganized life. He also contracted an unhappy marriage, with Irene Fabbricotti, a young woman from Tuscany, who gave him two daughters.

Count Lotteringhi died in 1895, and his heirs took away the studio. Left without that resource, Grünhut's livelihood was precarious and he became more unruly. His excesses led to a physical and mental collapse; leaving him paralyzed and leading to his death in 1896 in Florence, aged only thirty-three.

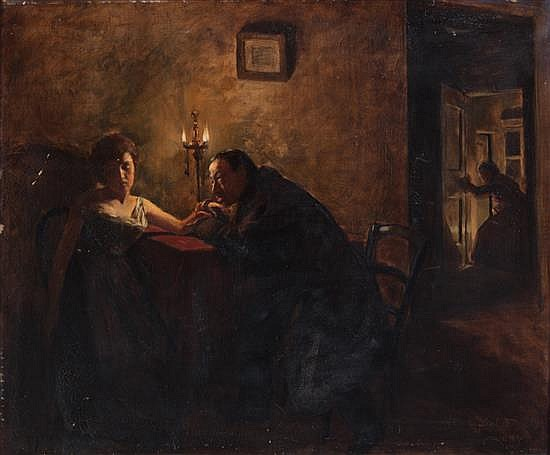
Unwanted Advances, 1891
