= Revoltella Museum =

Modern art gallery in Trieste, Italy

Coordinates: 45°38′49″N 13°45′47″E

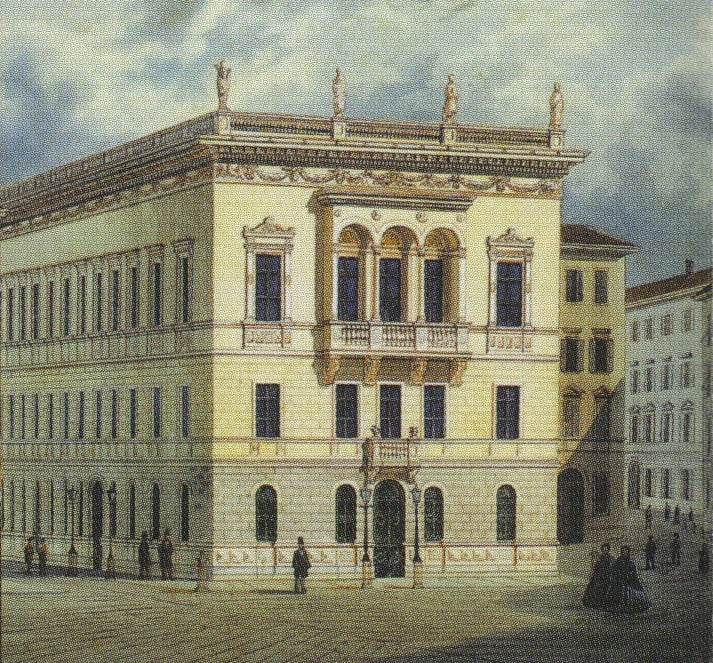
The Revoltella Museum in Trieste

The Revoltella Museum (Italian: Museo Revoltella) is a modern art gallery founded in Trieste, Italy, in 1872 by Baron Pasquale Revoltella. The baron left his house to the city (located in Piazza Venezia), including all the artworks, furniture and books it contained.

== Museum ==
The main building, designed by Friedrich Hitzig, was built in 1858. In 1907, in order to expand the original collection, the city acquired the Brunner palace located nearby. However, this building was only put to full use in 1963, following a reconstruction by Carlo Scarpa. The museum today is composed of three buildings with a total exhibition area of 4,000 square meters and the main entrance from Via Diaz.

== Exhibits ==
In addition to the works bequeathed by baron Revoltella, the city also acquired additional artworks over the years. On permanent display today are about 350 paintings and sculptures. The Brunner palace hosts works of Italian authors of the second half of the 19th century (third floor), the works acquired in the early decades of the 20th century (fourth floor), the works of artists from the Friuli-Venezia Giulia region (fifth floor) and national (sixth floor) in the second half of the 20th century.

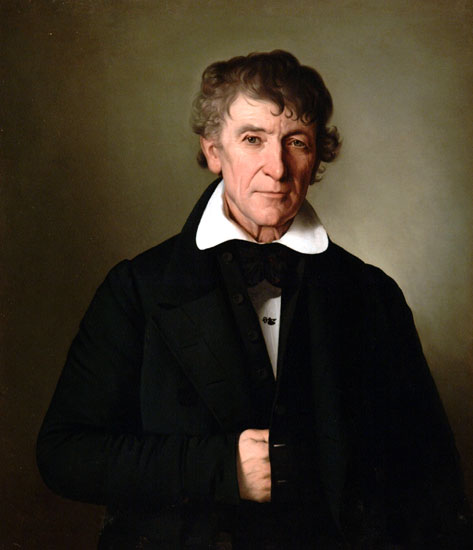
Giuseppe Tominz: Old Man 1840

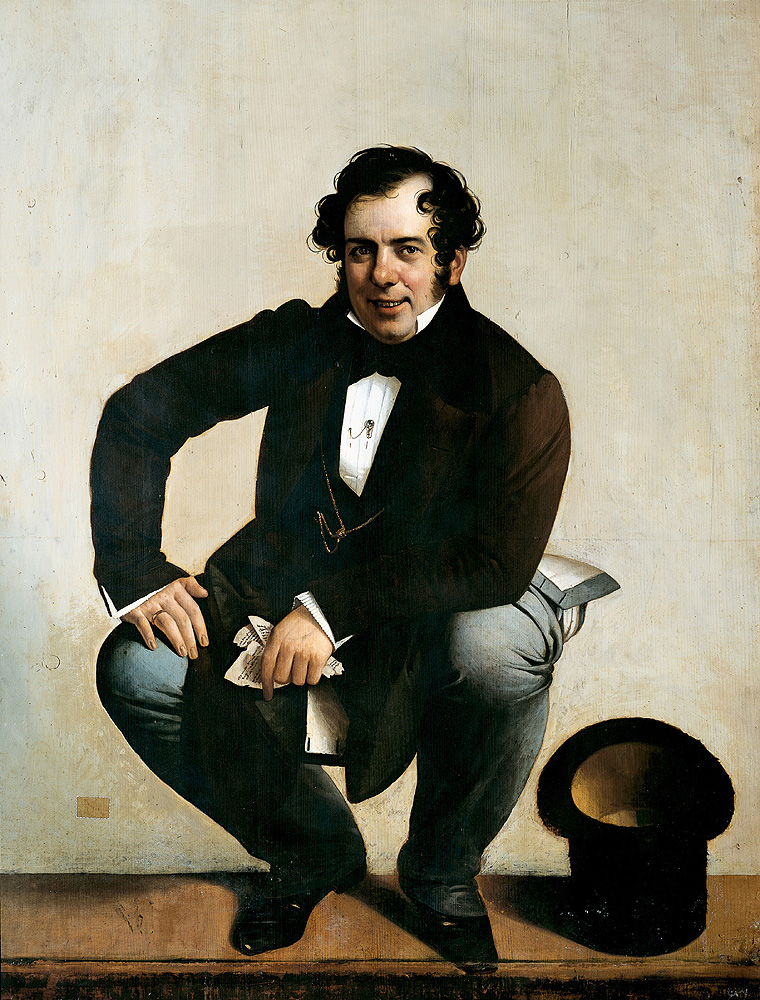
Giuseppe Tominz: self-portrait 1825

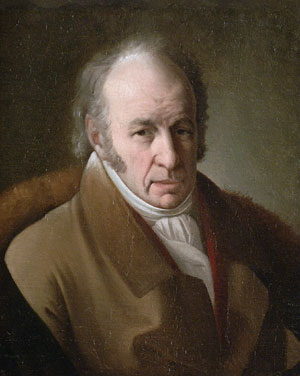
Giuseppe Tominz: Giuseppe Bernardino Bison, 1830

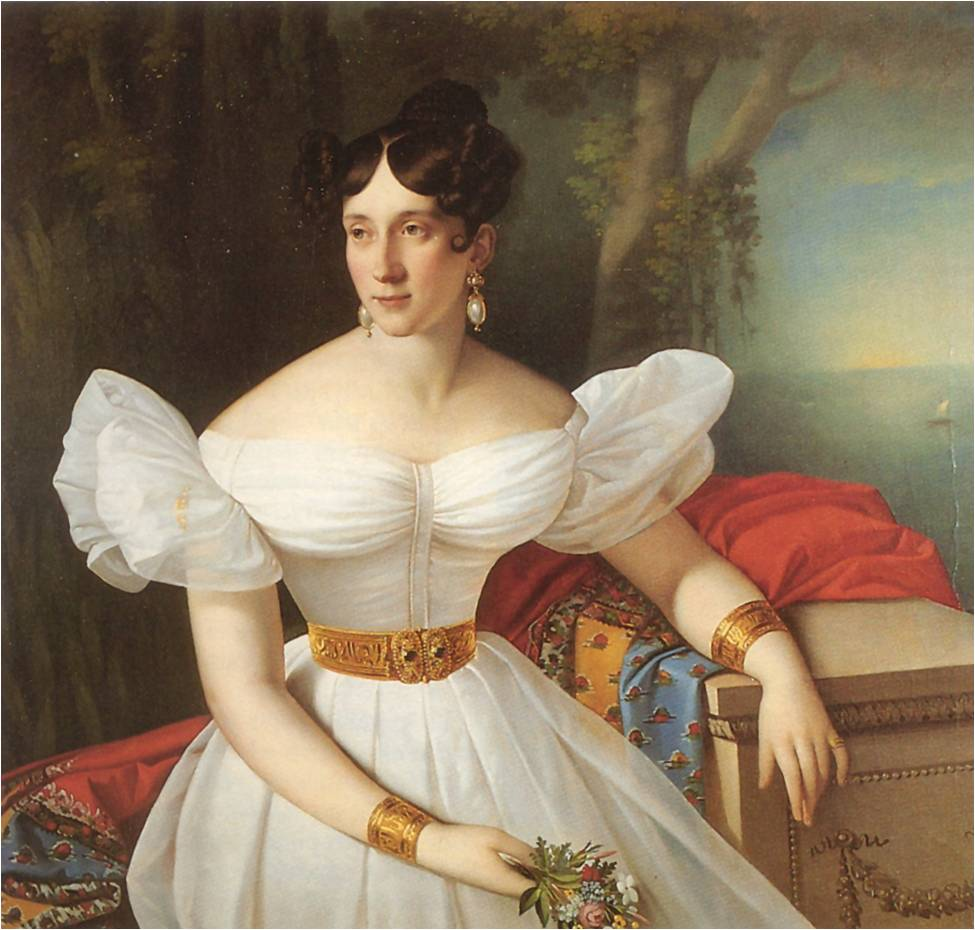
Giuseppe Tominz: Giuseppina Holzknecht 1832

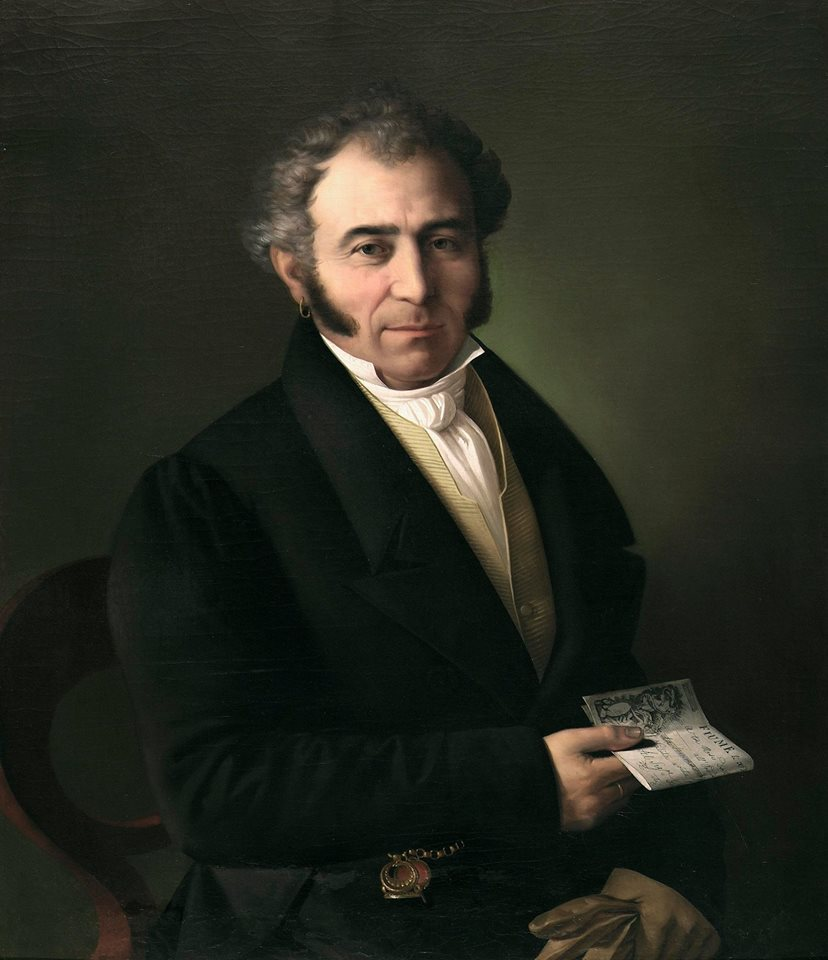
Giuseppe Tominz: Filippo Amodeo 1832

Notable Italian and European artists whose works are exhibited in the gallery include:

- Giuseppe Barison
- Carlo Carrà
- Felice Casorati
- Giorgio de Chirico
- Eduardo Dalbono
- Mario Deluigi
- Giovanni Fattori
- Lucio Fontana
- Giuseppe Lorenzo Gatteri
- Isidoro Grünhut
- Francesco Hayez
- Domenico Induno
- Giacomo Manzù
- Giuseppe De Nittis
- Arnaldo Pomodoro
- Manlio Rho
- Antonio Rotta
- Mario Sironi
- Giuseppe Tominz
- Ignacio Zuloaga

== Museum directors ==
- Augusto Tominz (1872–1883)
- Alfredo Tominz (1883–1926)
- Piero Sticotti (1927–1929)
- Edgardo Sambo (1929–1956)
- Giulio Montenero (1960–1989)
- Maria Masau Dan (1992)

== Gallery ==
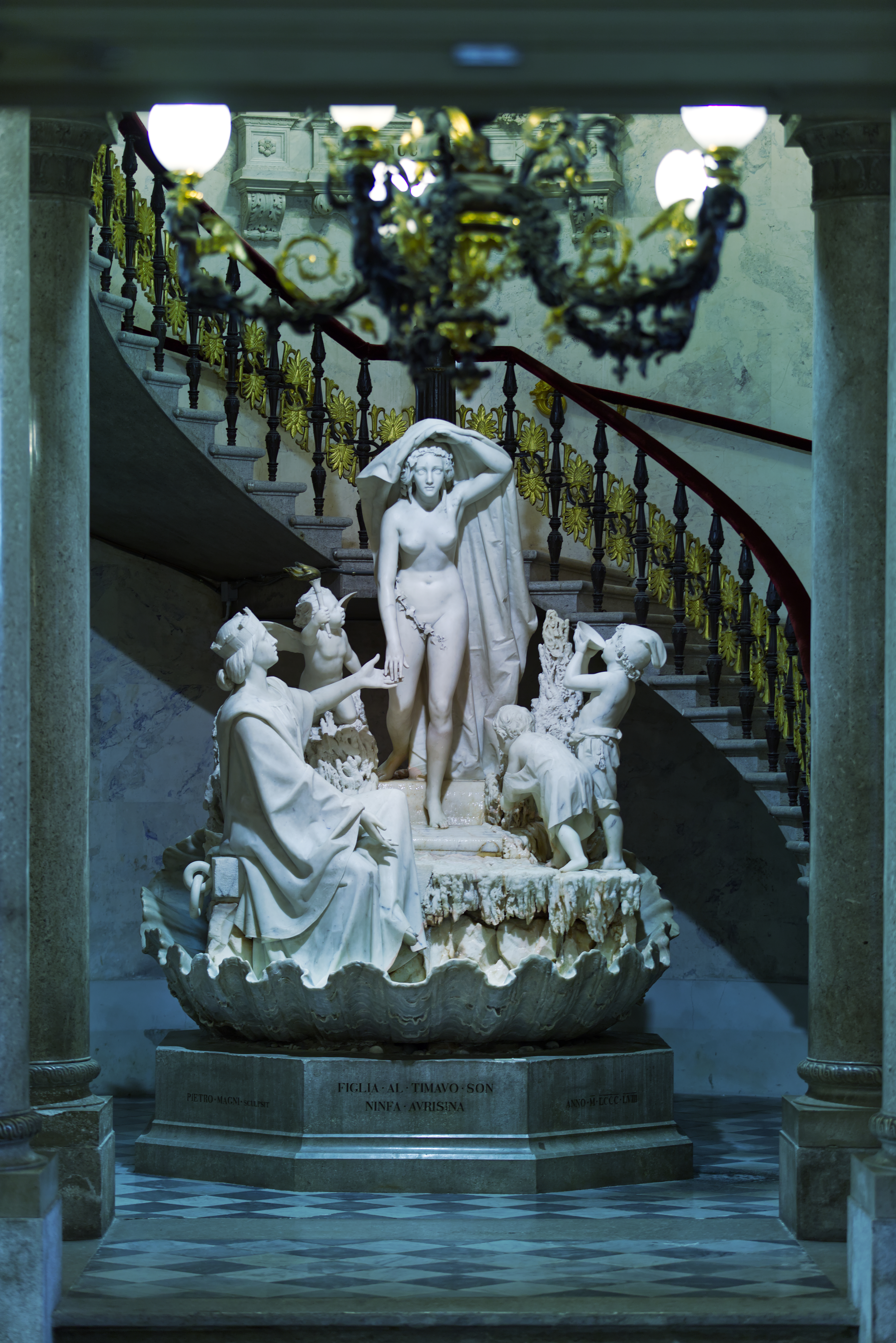
Ninfa Avrisina: Figlia al Timavo Son
