= Giuseppe Barison =

Italian painter (1853–1931)

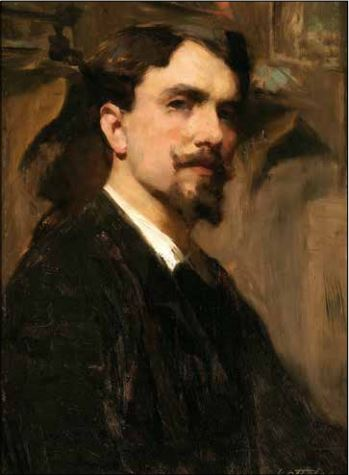
Self-portrait (date unknown)

Giuseppe Barison (September 5, 1853 – January 7, 1931) was a Triestiner painter and engraver, active in Venice.

== Life and career ==
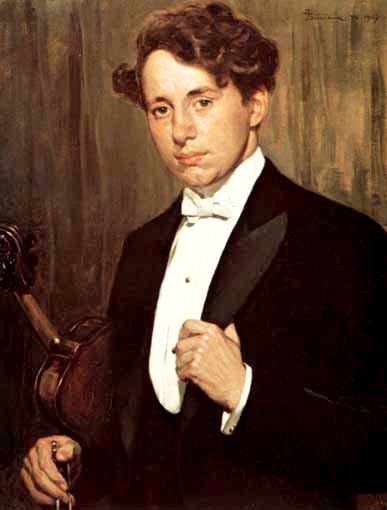
Giuseppe's son Cesare, a violinist

He was born in Trieste, Austrian Empire to a family of modest means. His father was a tailor. Barison found a patron in the aristocratic Anna De Rin, who placed him in apprenticeship with the painter Carl Haase (1820-1876) in Trieste, and then enrolled him in the Academy of Fine Arts in Vienna. In 1872, Barison began to take lessons from the Nazarene painters Karl von Blaas and Eduard von Engerth, and also took courses in art history from August Eisenmenger.

Returning to Trieste in 1876, the next year he participated at the Esposizione di Belle Arti, with a canvas depicting Isabella Orsini and her Page, which gains him a two-year stipend from the city to study in Rome. After Rome, he spent some years in Venice, where he was influenced by Giacomo Favretto, and exhibited with the Società Veneta Promotrice di Belle Arti from 1880 onward. In 1886, his painting Pescheria a Rialto won the Prince Umberto Prize, but because of his non-Italian nationality, the award was rescinded.

His wife Giulia, originally from Trieste, and not happily settled in Venice, successfully urged her husband to relocate to Trieste, now with his family of three children (Arnaldo, Cesare and Ester). He experienced a chilly reception there, in part due to his personality, and in part due to his Venetian style of painting.

At the national exhibition of 1887, Barison was influenced by two paintings, Neapolitan Michele Cammarano's The Brawl (La Rissa), and Genoese Nicolò Barabino's Quasi oliva speciosa. Barison was to echo these paintings in his works After the Brawl (Dopo una rissa) (painted a few months later) and Quasi oliva speciosa in campis in 1899. The latter has a fluid loose brushwork that is characteristic of his later years (demonstrated also by his self-portrait). In Trieste, he gained commissions for the panels for the Savings Bank of Trieste in 1912 depicting The Builders (which includes a self-portrait in a flowing red robe) and The Merchants.

Subjects of his paintings in the early century include horses rendered with extreme care and precision in the painting Old Song (Municipality of Trieste). The First World War exiled Barison to the house of his son-in-law, the artist Roberto Amadi, in Pegli, Liguria where he stayed from 1915 to 1918, and continued painting land- and sea-scapes. After the war, he returned to Trieste, and along with contemporaries Guido Grimani (1871-1933) and Ugo Flumiani (1876-1938), continued to paint such themes. He often painted outdoors.

In his last years Barison took on new influences, including that of Umberto Veruda. He continued to paint for the first two decades of the twentieth century, but by then his paintings still evoked the past century. He died in Trieste on January 7, 1931.

== Selected paintings ==
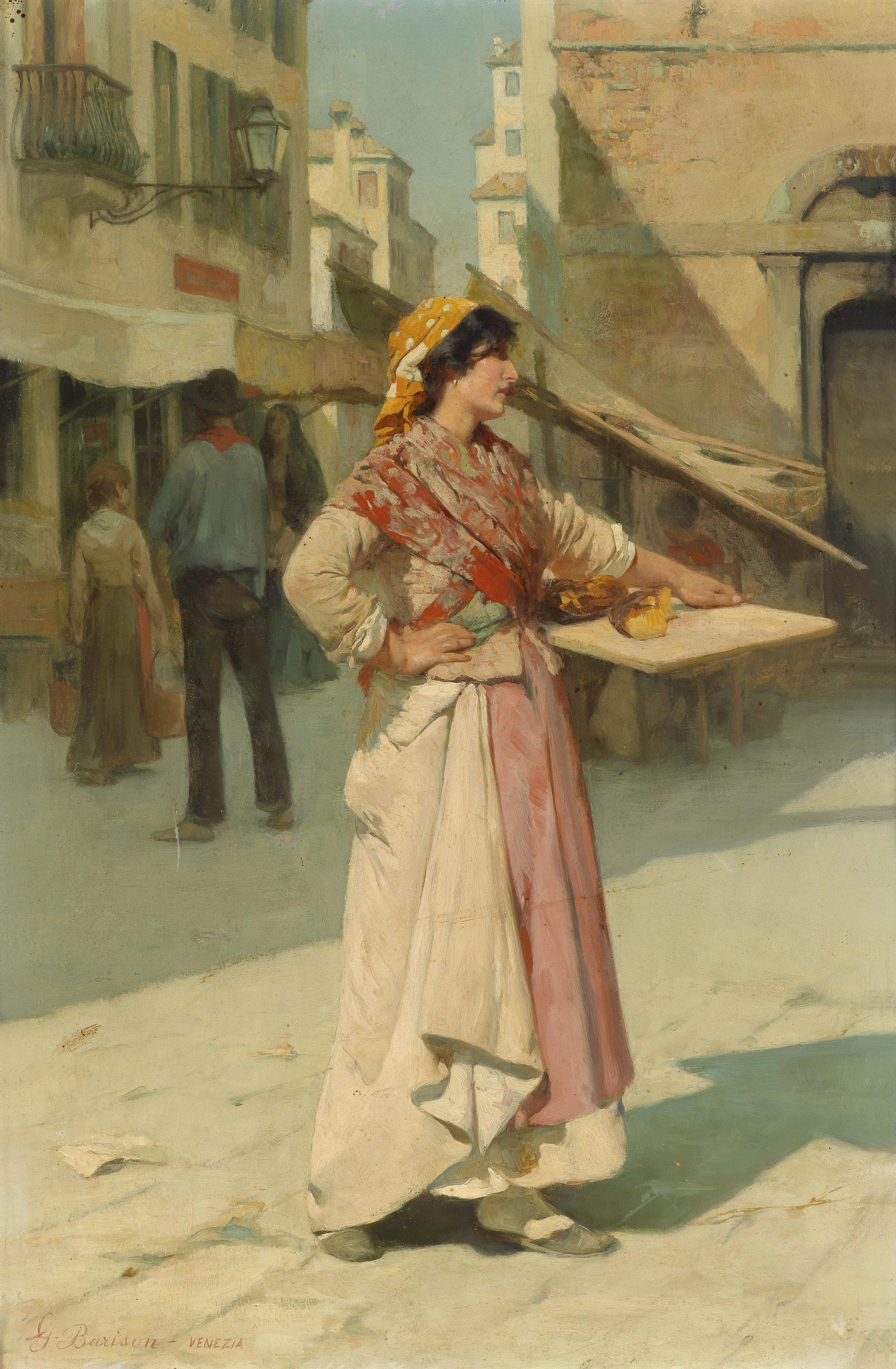
Venetian Salesgirl

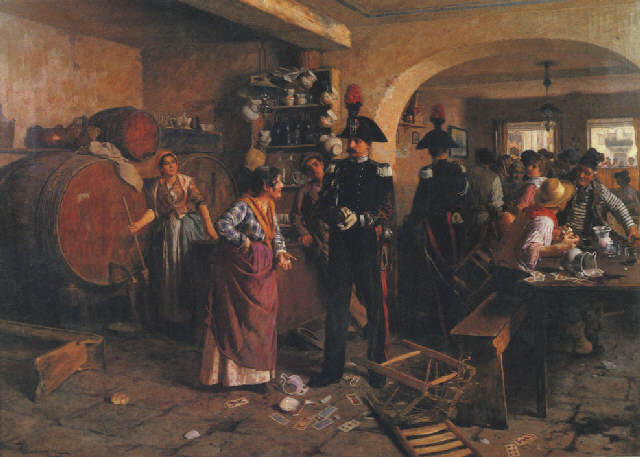
After the Fight

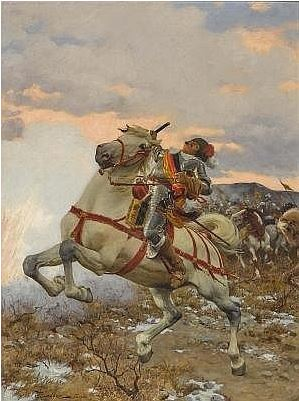
Cavalryman in Battle

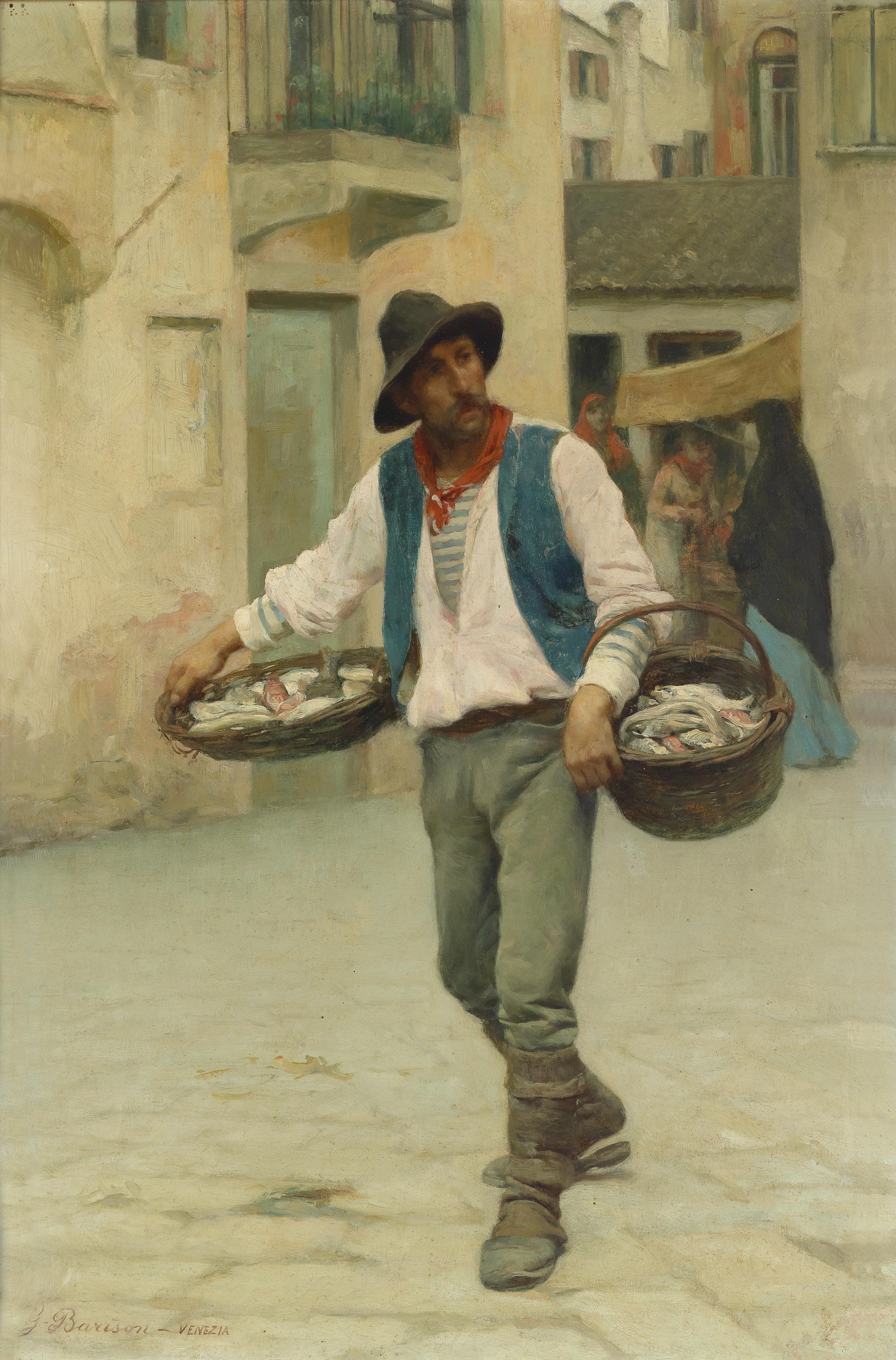
Venetian Fishmonger
