= Giacomo Rampelli =

Rector of the Jesuit College of Trieste
- In office 1622–1630

Personal details
- Born: Pisino, Istria, Duchy of Carniola, Holy Roman Empire
- Died: In or after 1630 Trieste, Holy Roman Empire (?)

Giacomo Rampelli (fl. 1620s) was an Istrian Italian Jesuit, who was the first rector of the Jesuit College of Trieste.

== Biography ==
Rampelli was born in Pisino, Istria (then part of the Duchy of Carniola, Holy Roman Empire) into a prominent local family. The Rampelli traced their origin to the Aeolian Islands in Southern Italy, the first member of the family being Leonardo, public notary and Pisino chancellor, active there from the first half of the 15th century, from the island of Salina.

He pushed for the foundation of the College of Jesuits in Trieste (now the Chiesa di Santa Maria Maggiore), becoming its first rector in 1622.
