= Umberto Veruda =

Italian painter (1868–1904)

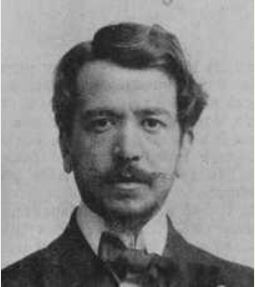
Umberto Veruda

Umberto Veruda (6 April 1868, Trieste - 29 August 1904, Trieste) was an Austro-Hungarian painter, known for his portraits and upper-class society scenes.

== Biography ==
He was born to a family of modest means. He was introduced to the art of painting by a local artist, originally from Bologna, named Raffaele Astolfi (1829-1900); known for portraits in the Academic style. In 1884, at the age of sixteen, he went to Munich, where he was able to enroll at the Academy of Fine Arts, where his fellow Triestini, Carlo Wostry and Isidoro Grünhut, were also studying. His primary instructor was Alexander von Wagner. During this time, he was influenced by the works of Max Liebermann.

In 1887, he visited Paris for the first time and spent six months there drawing, rather than painting oils, with William Adolphe Bouguereau and Joseph Nicolas Robert-Fleury. After a short stay in Venice, where he studied the works of Favretto, Velàquez, Tintoretto and Titian, he returned to Trieste. In 1889, thanks to contributions from some private individuals who were impressed by his talent, he was able to study in Rome. After winning an art prize established by the Baroness Cecilia de Rittmeyer, he had sufficient means to stay there for two more years. Shortly after, the Galleria Nazionale d'Arte Moderna purchased his painting "Sii onesta" (Be Honest).

The next period of his life involved extensive travelling; to Berlin, Munich, Budapest, Vienna (where his works were especially successful), then back to Paris in 1897. He finally paid a visit to London, to study English art from the 18th and early 19th centuries. In 1903, he was invited to Blenheim Palace, where he painted portraits of several members of the Spencer family.

In the spring of 1904, his mother died tragically. His close friend, the author Italo Svevo, offered him the hospitality of his home in Burano, where he met with the painters Italico Brass and Pieretto Bianco (1875-1937); old acquaintances from Paris. In the middle of summer, he left Burano. He died shortly after, aged only thirty-six, but the cause of his death is unknown. A retrospective of his works was held in his honor, and a small monument was erected on his grave at the Cimitero di Sant'Anna. A street in Trieste has been named after him.

In 1932, the Circolo Artistico di Trieste placed a bust of Veruda in the Giardino Pubblico. It was created by the sculptor, Giovanni Mayer (1863-1946), a friend of Veruda's whose portrait he had painted. Veruda also appears as a character (the sculptor Stefano Balli) in Svevo's novel, Senilità; translated into English under the title As a Man Grows Older.

== Selected paintings ==
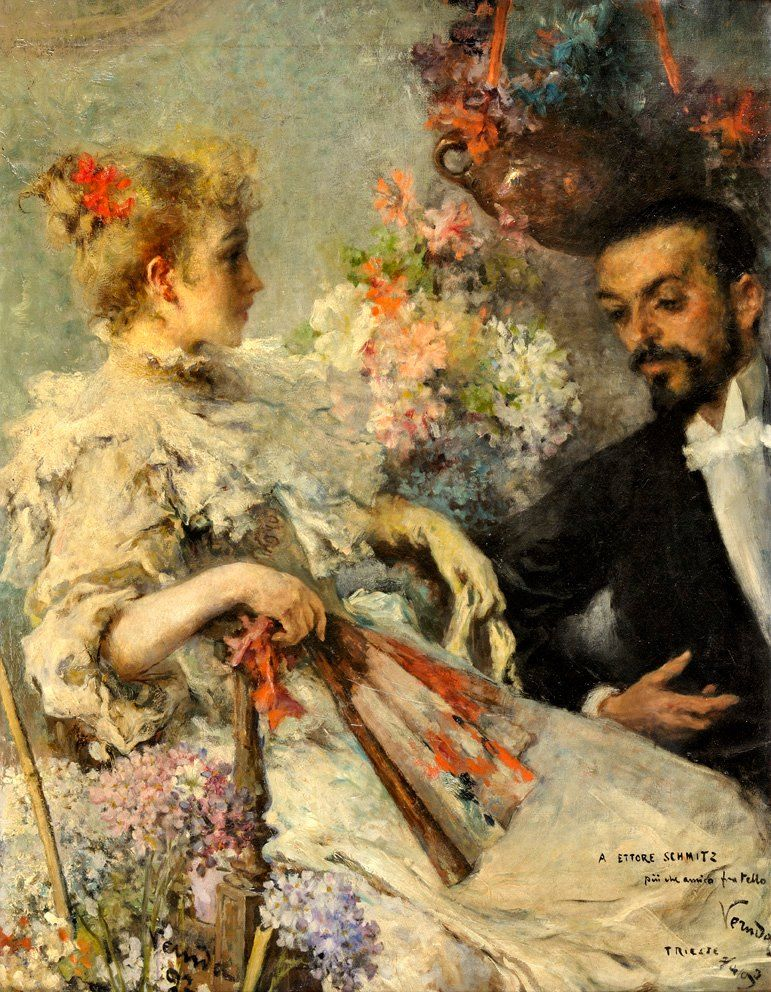
Italo Svevo,
and his sister Hortensia

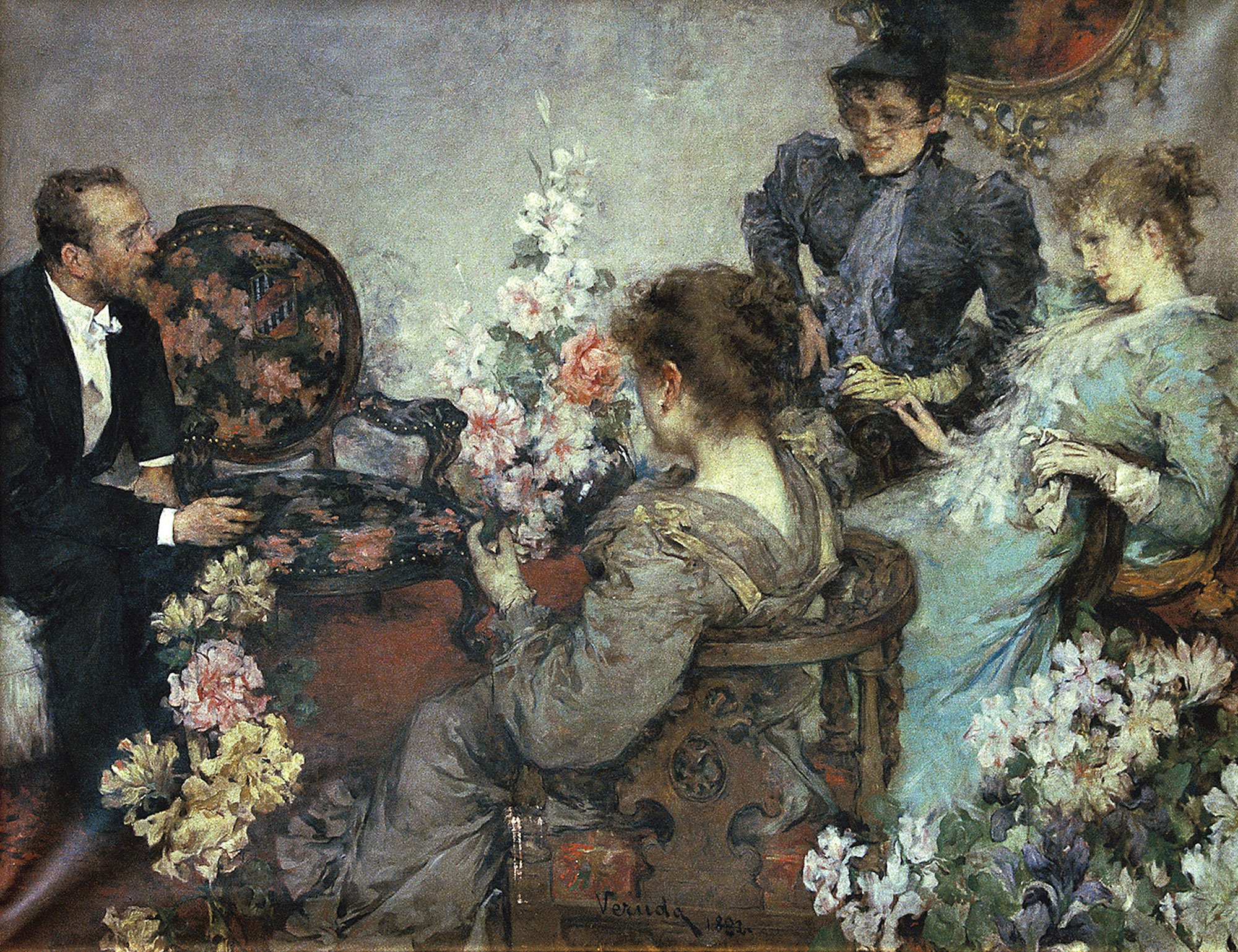
The News

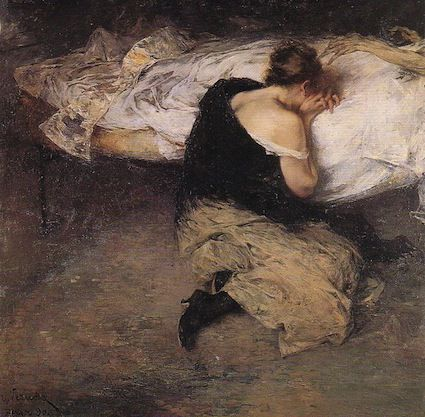
Be Honest!

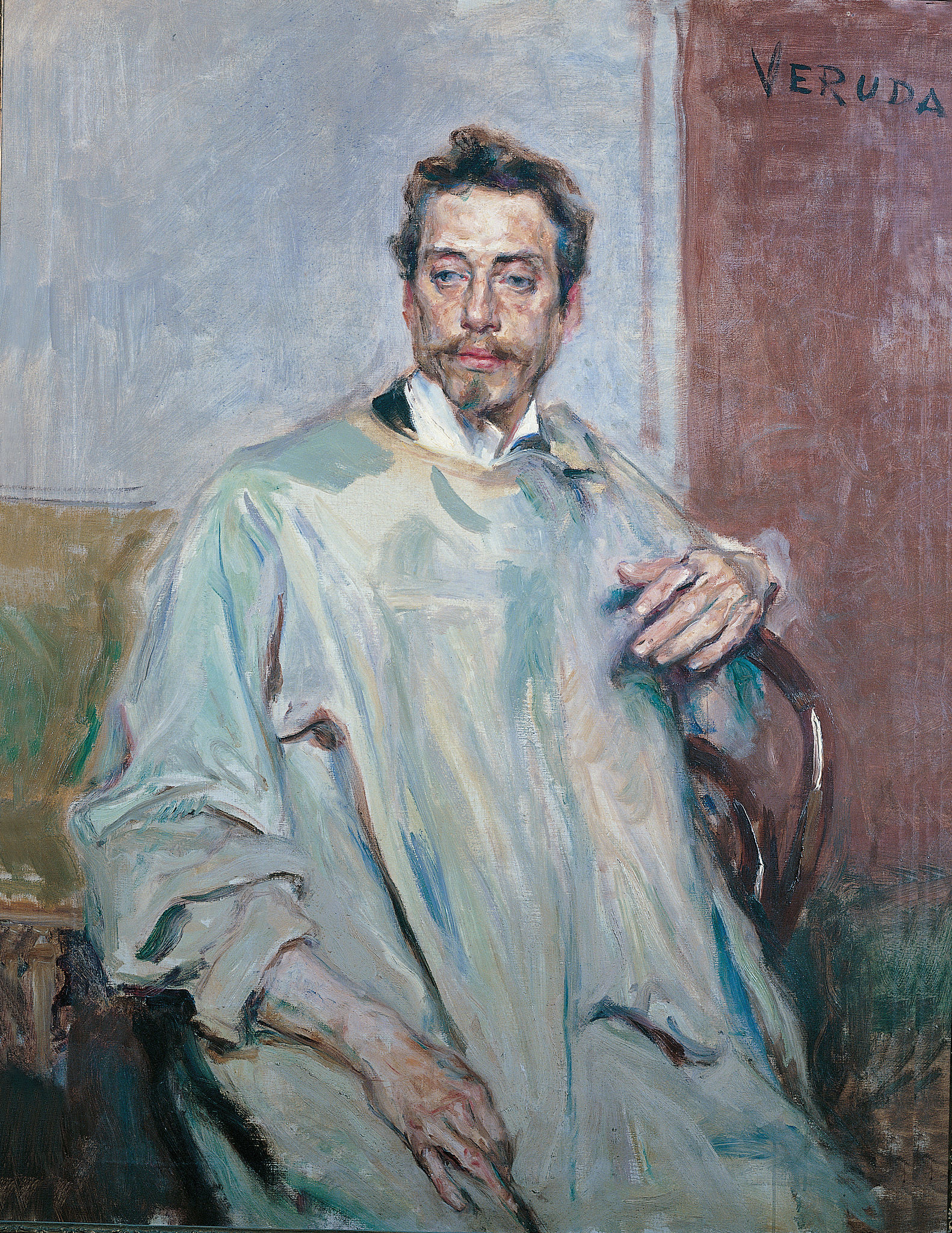
The sculptor,
Giovanni Mayer

== Sources ==
- Biography from the - Enciclopedia Italiana @ Treccani
- Biography in the Österreichisches Biographisches Lexikon
- Maria Chiara Provenzano, "Garofani al cioccolatte": corrispondenze cromatiche tra Italo Svevo e Umberto Veruda", in Letteratura & Arte, n. 15, 2017
