= Santa Maria Maggiore, Trieste =

Church in Trieste, Italy

Church of Santa Maria Maggiore Chiesa di Santa Maria Maggiore (in Italian)
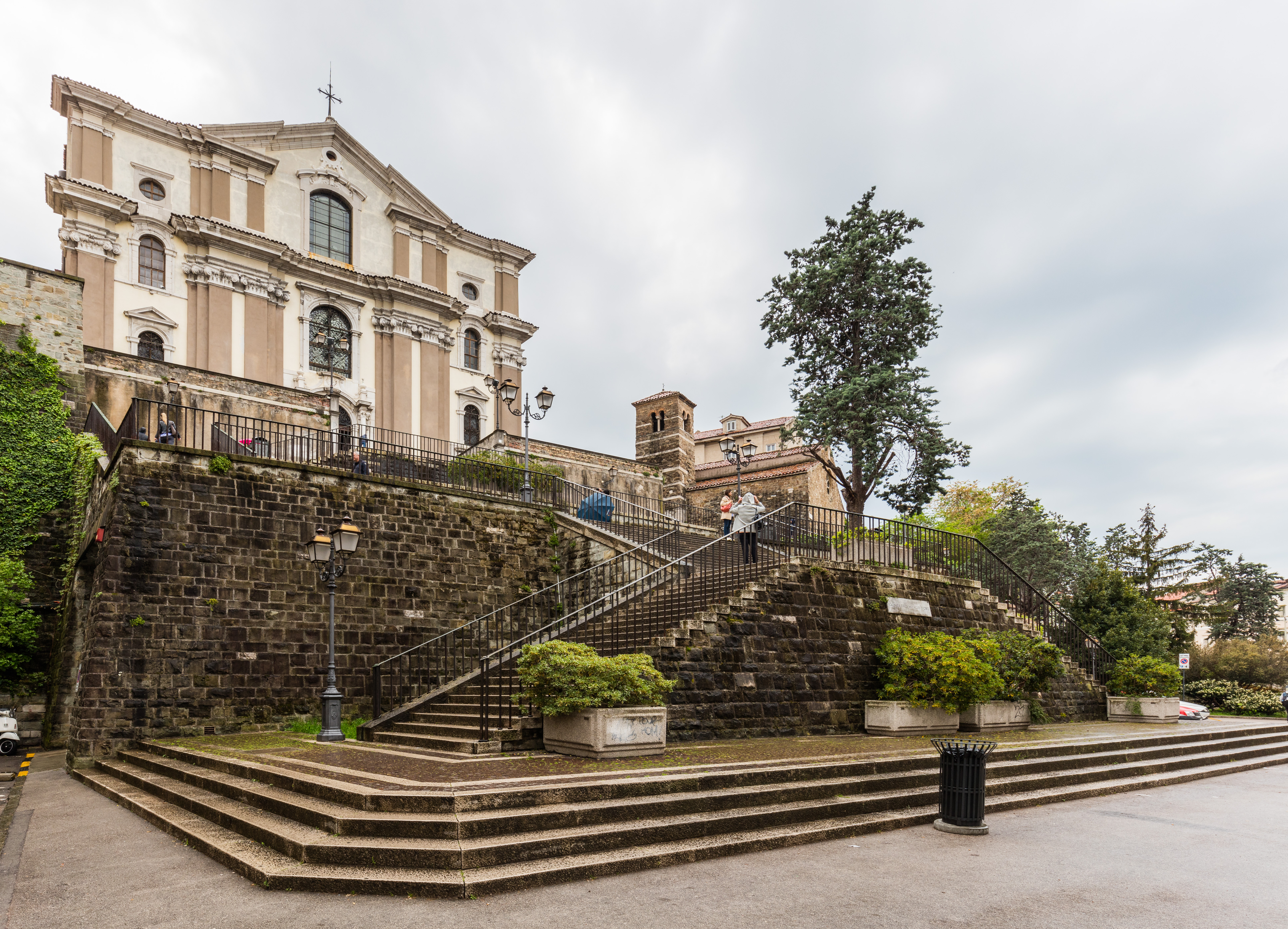
- The facade of the church in 2017

Religion
- Affiliation: Roman Catholic
- Diocese: Diocese of Trieste
- Rite: Roman
- Ecclesiastical or organizational status: Church
- Year consecrated: 1682

Location
- Location: Trieste, Italy
- Interactive map of Church of Santa Maria Maggiore; Chiesa di Santa Maria Maggiore (in Italian)
- Administration: Order of Friars Minor
- Coordinates: 45.3852°N 13.4609°E

Architecture
- Type: Church
- Style: Baroque
- Groundbreaking: 1627

The Church of the Immaculate Conception of the Blessed Virgin Mary, better known as the Church of Santa Maria Maggiore, and also known as the Baroque church of the Jesuits, is a religious building located in Trieste, in the province and diocese of Trieste; it is the seat of a parish included in the deanery of San Giusto Martire.

The Baroque church was built in the 17th century by the Jesuit company and has been managed by the Franciscan friars since 1922. The church is located in via del Collegio, at the foot of the San Giusto hill and near the Basilica of Cristo Salvatore (formerly Basilica of San Silvestro), in the immediate vicinity of the historic center of Trieste.

== History ==
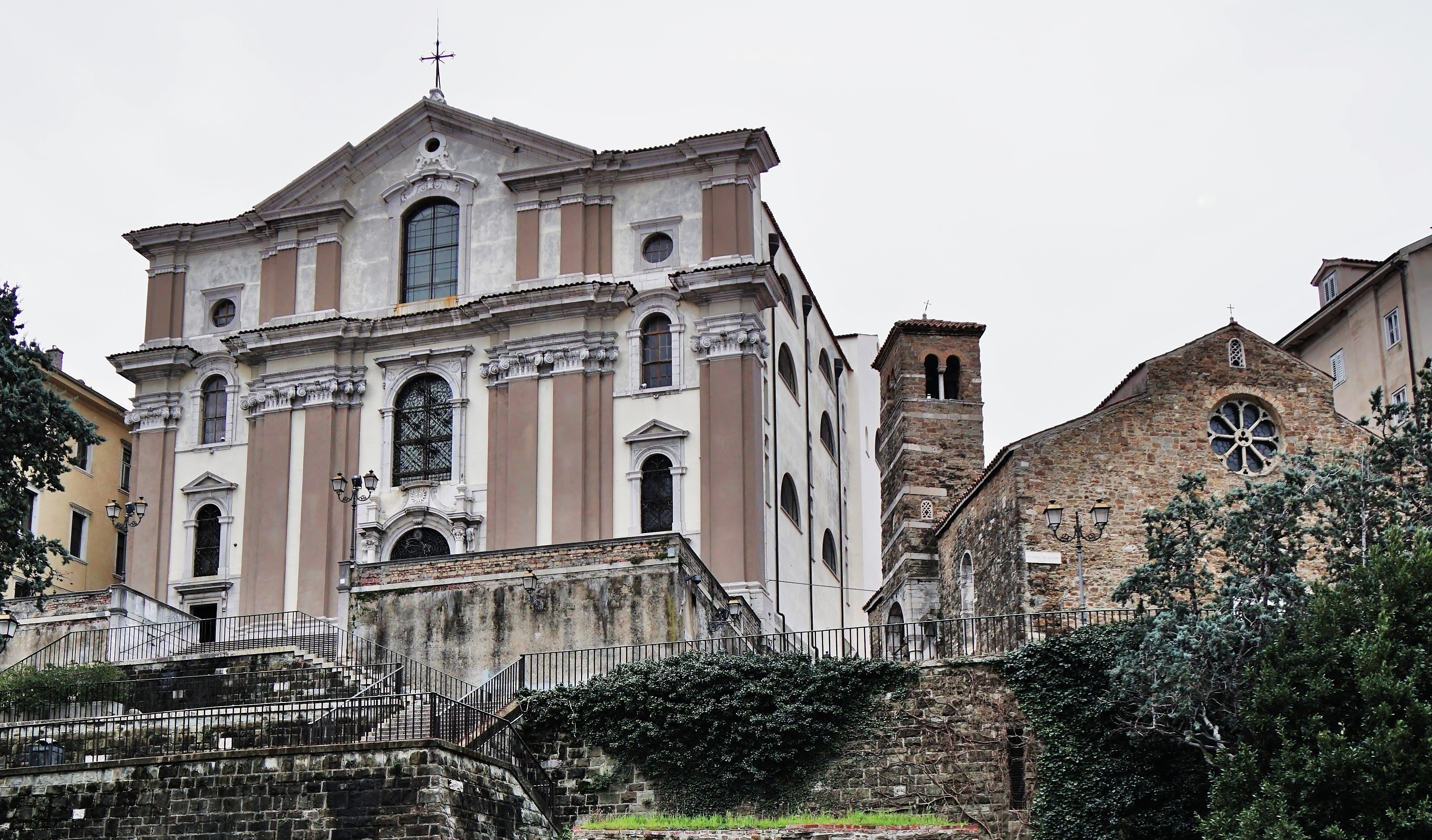
Church of Santa Maria Maggiore (left) and Basilica of Cristo Salvatore (right)

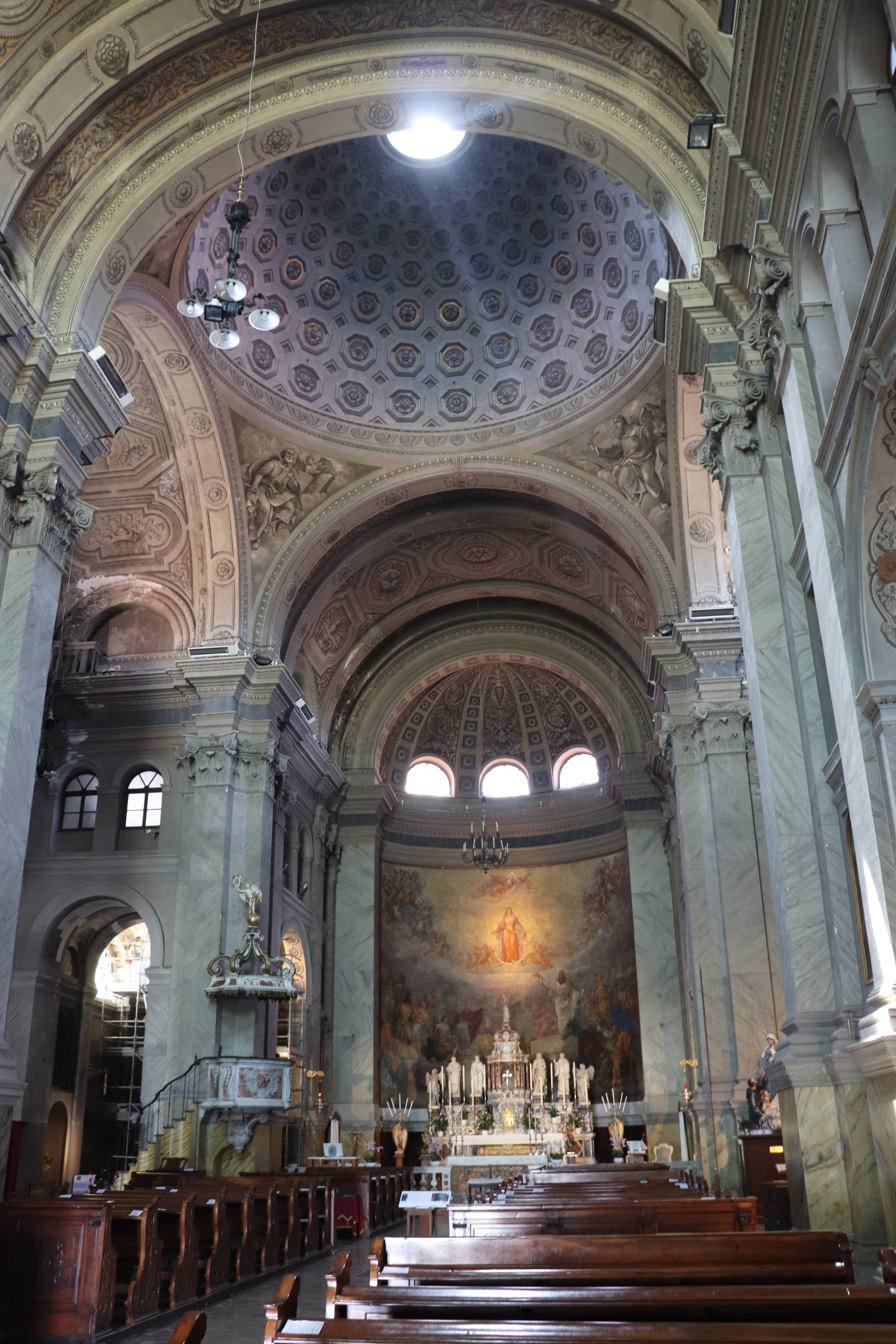
Interior

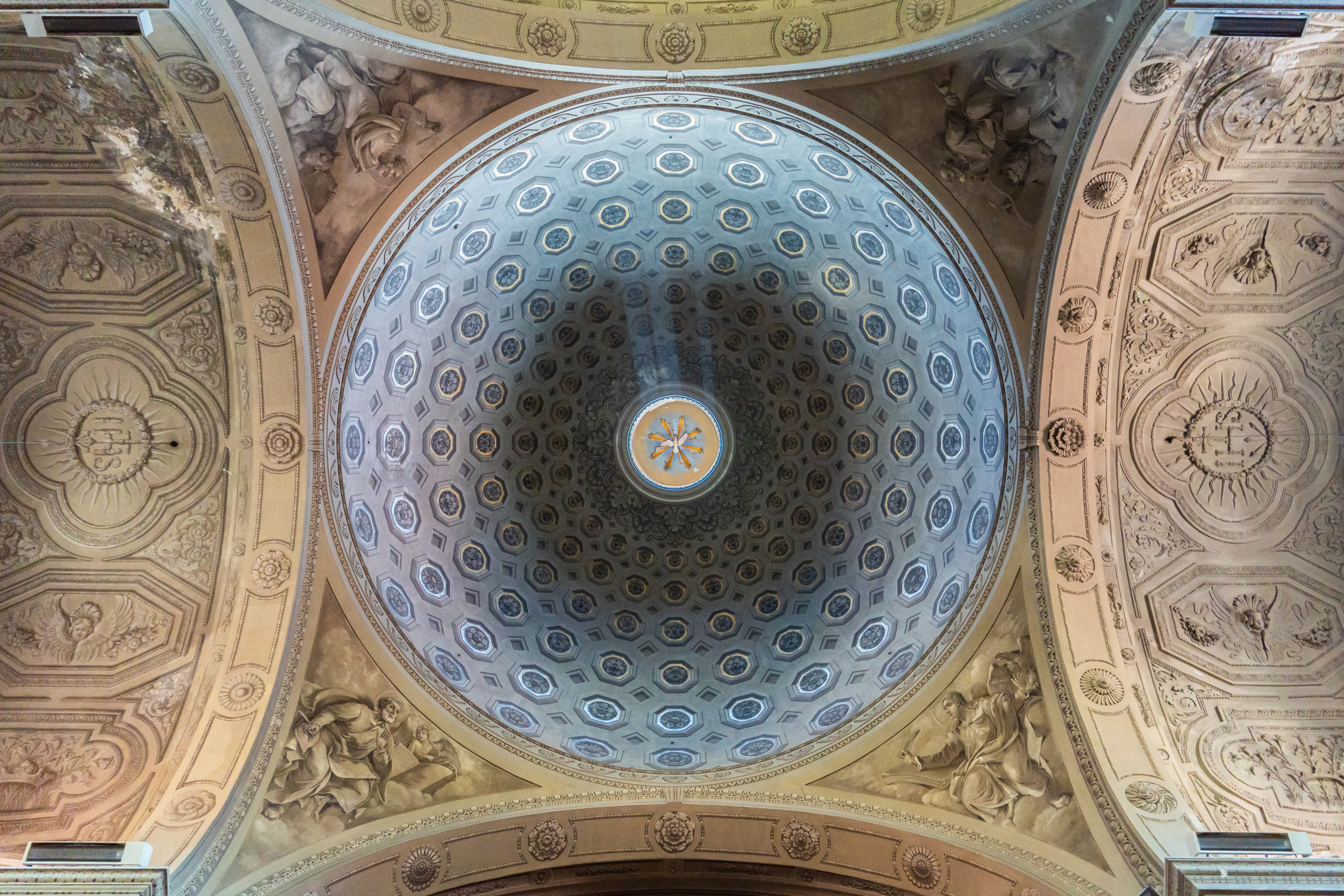
View of the dome

The history of the Church of Santa Maria Maggiore is closely linked to that of the Jesuit congregation of Trieste.

In 1619 the first two Jesuits, Giuseppe Mezler and Gregorio Salateo, arrived in Trieste. Thanks to the good relationship with the government of the time, the order developed in a short time, so as to be able to commission the construction of a school. The Jesuit College is located next to the current church of Santa Maria Maggiore. The first rector of the church (1622–1630) was Giacomo Rampelli from Pisino. A little later it was decided to build the cult building, which was to be dedicated to the Madonna and be the largest sacred building in the city at that time.

The first stone was laid on 10 October 1627 by Bishop Rinaldo Scarlicchio of Trieste. However, the church building took decades to complete. When the church was consecrated on 11 October 1682 by Trieste bishop Giacomo Ferdinando Gorizutti, the roof of the building was still partly uncovered. In November of the same year, the wooden dome of the church was destroyed by a fire that broke out in a nearby oil mill. When the Jesuit order was dissolved in 1773, the church had not yet been completed. The dome, two altars and other elements of the interior were missing. The dome was completed only in 1817.

Due to the few preserved documents on the construction of the church, it is not clear who was responsible for the entire building project or individual elements within the church. It is assumed that Giacomo Briani (1589–1649), a Jesuit from Modena, was responsible for a considerable part of the interior design. The facade of the building was completed around 1701 and is probably the work of the Trentino Jesuit Andrea Pozzo (1642–1709).

On 21 November 2011, during the celebration of the Madonna della Salute, the church was given the title of diocesan sanctuary by Archbishop Giampaolo Crepaldi.

== Description ==
=== Façade ===
The facade of the church is in the Baroque style. It stands on two levels with a tympanum and is vertically divided into three parts by bundles of Corinthian pilasters which underline the division of the interior into three naves.

=== Interior ===
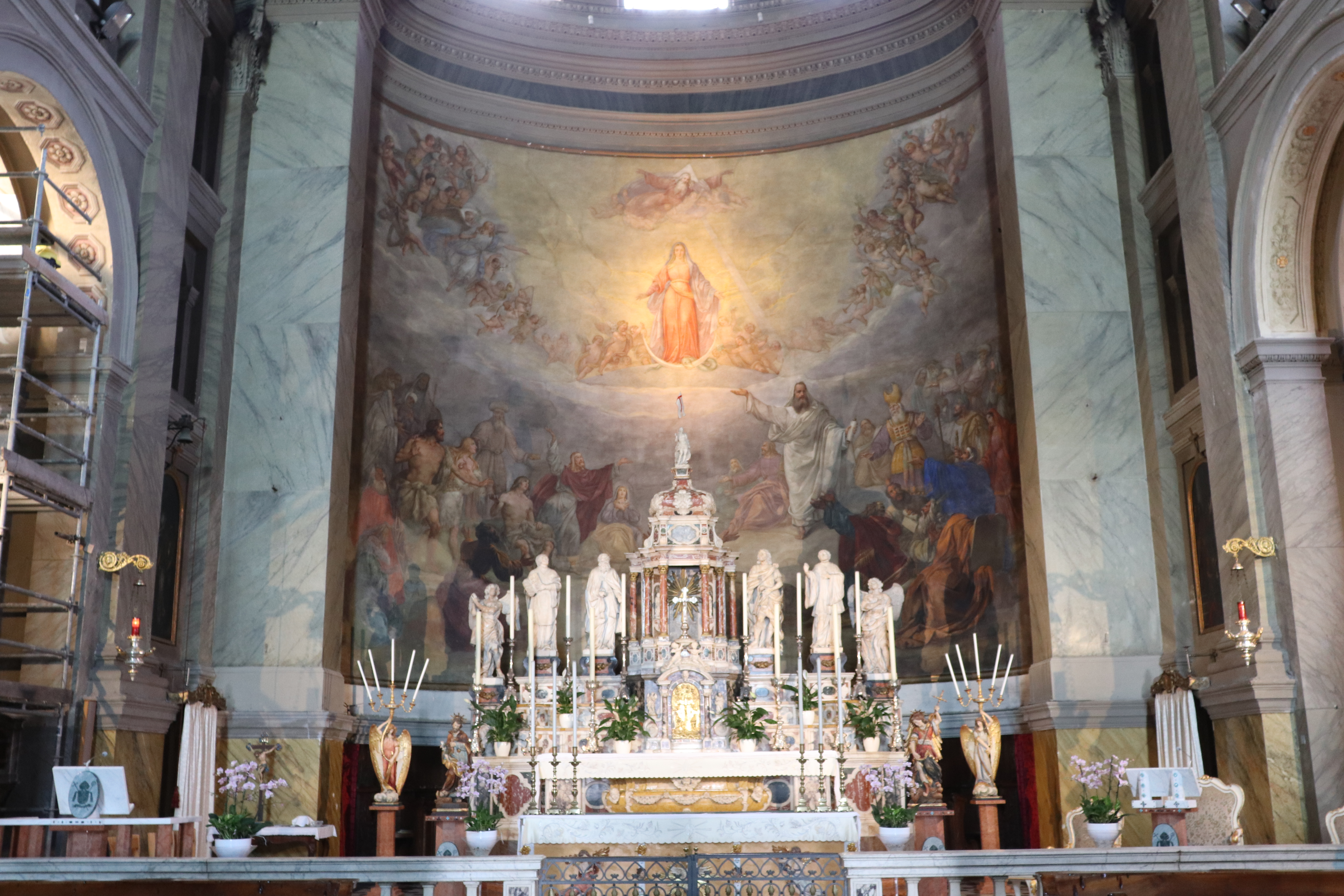
The high altar and the apse

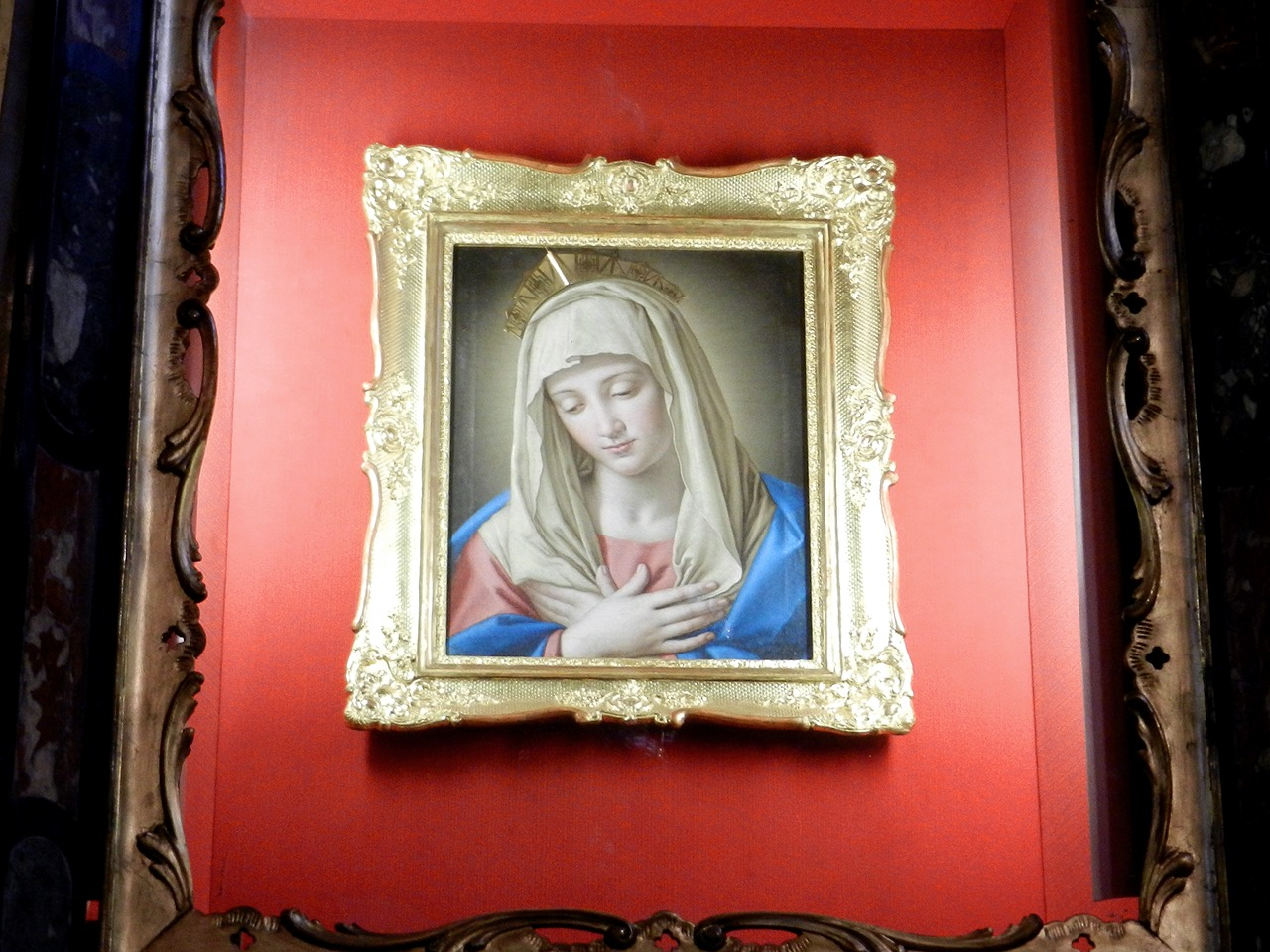
The Virgin attributed to Giovanni Battista Salvi da Sassoferrato

The interior has a Latin cross plan divided into three naves, with a transept and apse. On the crossing stands the dome built in 1817 and frescoed by Giuseppe Bernardino Bison with the Quattro Evangelisti and false architectures.

The high altar is dedicated to the Immaculate Conception of the Virgin Mary. It was built between 1672 and 1717. Some restorations were carried out in the 19th century. On both sides of the tabernacle are the marble statues of the saints Ignatius of Loyola, Luigi Gonzaga, Francesco Borgia and Francesco Saverio. The altar continues optically in the apse mural with a depiction of the Immaculate Conception, frescoed in 1842 by Sebastiano Santi.

To the right of the apse is the chapel of the Madonna della Salute, with a 17th century painting of the Virgin attributed to Sassoferrato.

== Rectors ==
List of rectors of the church:
