= Museo Sartorio =

Museum in Trieste, Italy

Coordinates: 45°38′46″N 13°45′48″E

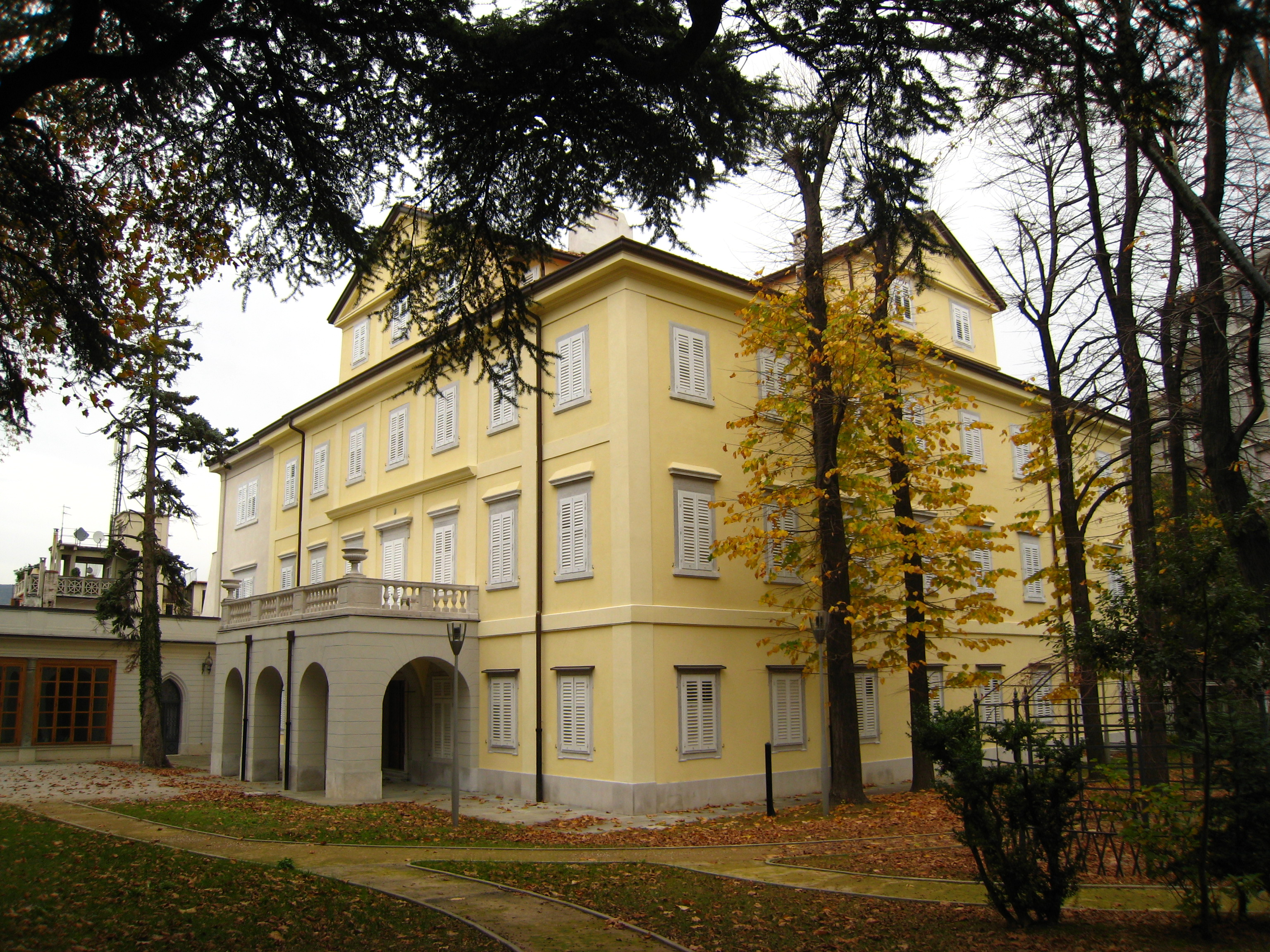
Villa Sartorio

The Civico Museo Sartorio is a museum in Trieste, northern Italy. Set in an urban villa, it exhibits ceramics, majolica, porcelain and pictures, typical equipment of Trieste's villas at the end of the 19th century.

Besides the villa itself being a very interesting building architecturally, it contains drawings of Giambattista Tiepolo, painting of Giambattista Pittoni and a glyptotheque. The museum opened to the public partially in 1949 and completely 1954. In 2006, the museum reopened after a period of renovation.

Currently the Museum hosts temporary exhibits and cultural events such as theatre and music in the summer.

== History ==
The villa once belonged, among the others, to the Sartorio dynasty originally from Sanremo. A branch of the family moved in 1775 to Trieste as part of its business expansion. Pietro Sartorio moved from Sanremo to Trieste with his family and bought the house, which had previously belonged to the merchant family Faraon, originary from Alexandria of Egypt. The last heir of the Sartorio family, Baroness Anna Segrè Sartorio, left the villa and all its furniture to Trieste's city council with the explicit wish to make it a public museum.

The villa was used by the Allies, as their headquarters after WW2, as can be seen by the marks on the tiles and walls where the telephone and electric leads were brought through.
