= Trieste =

City in Friuli-Venezia Giulia, Italy

Trieste Triest (Friulian) Trst (Slovene)
- Comune
- Comune di Trieste
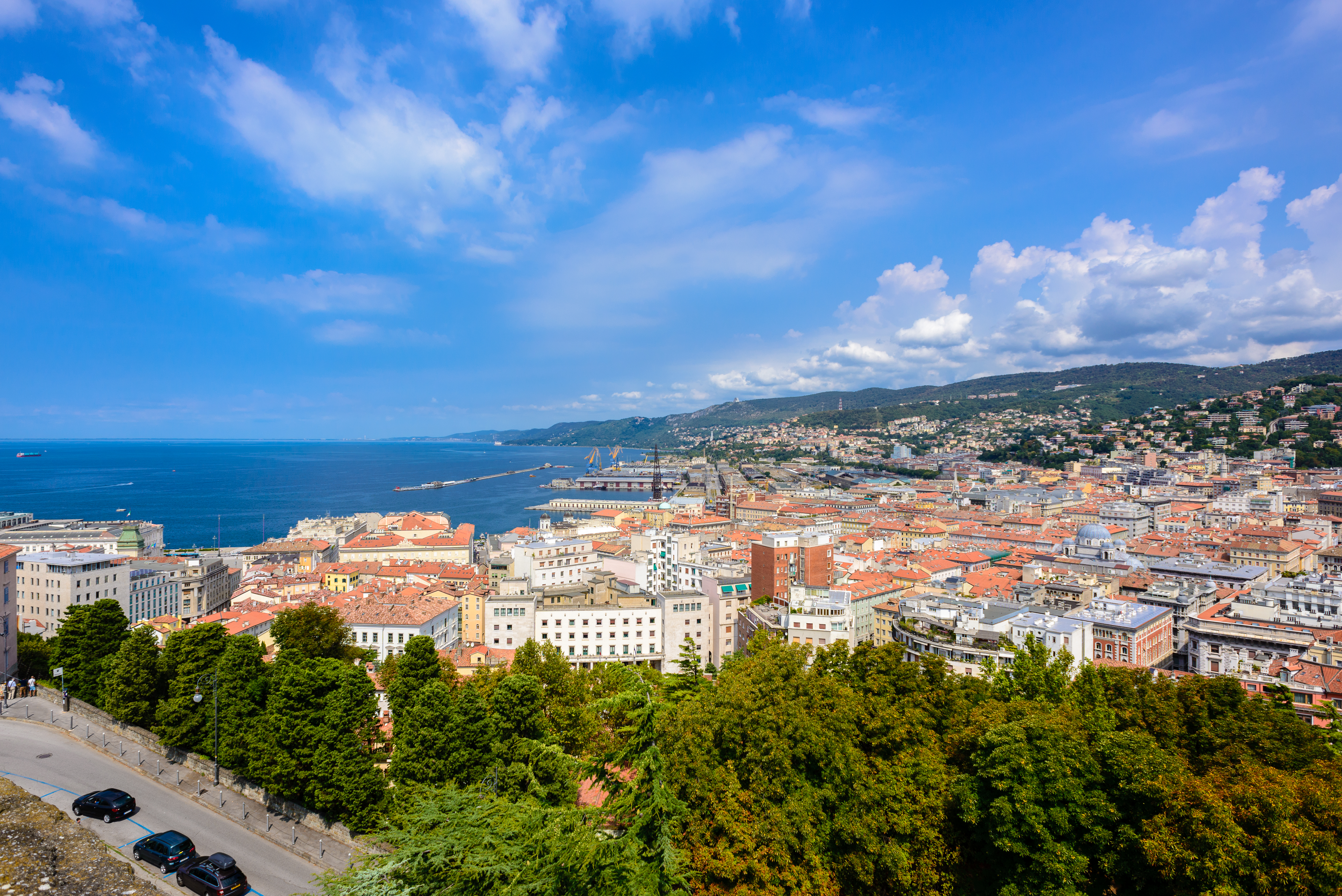
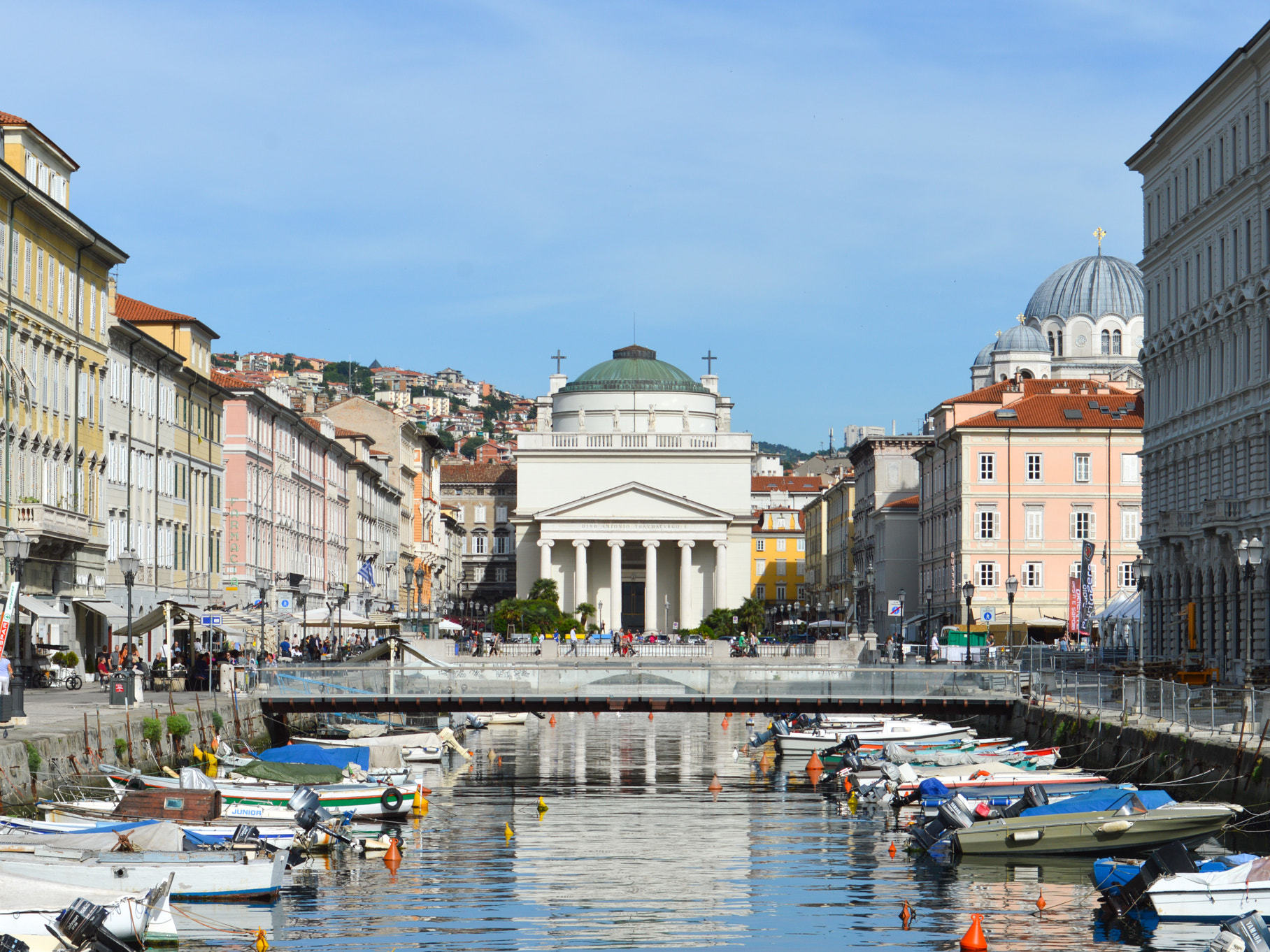
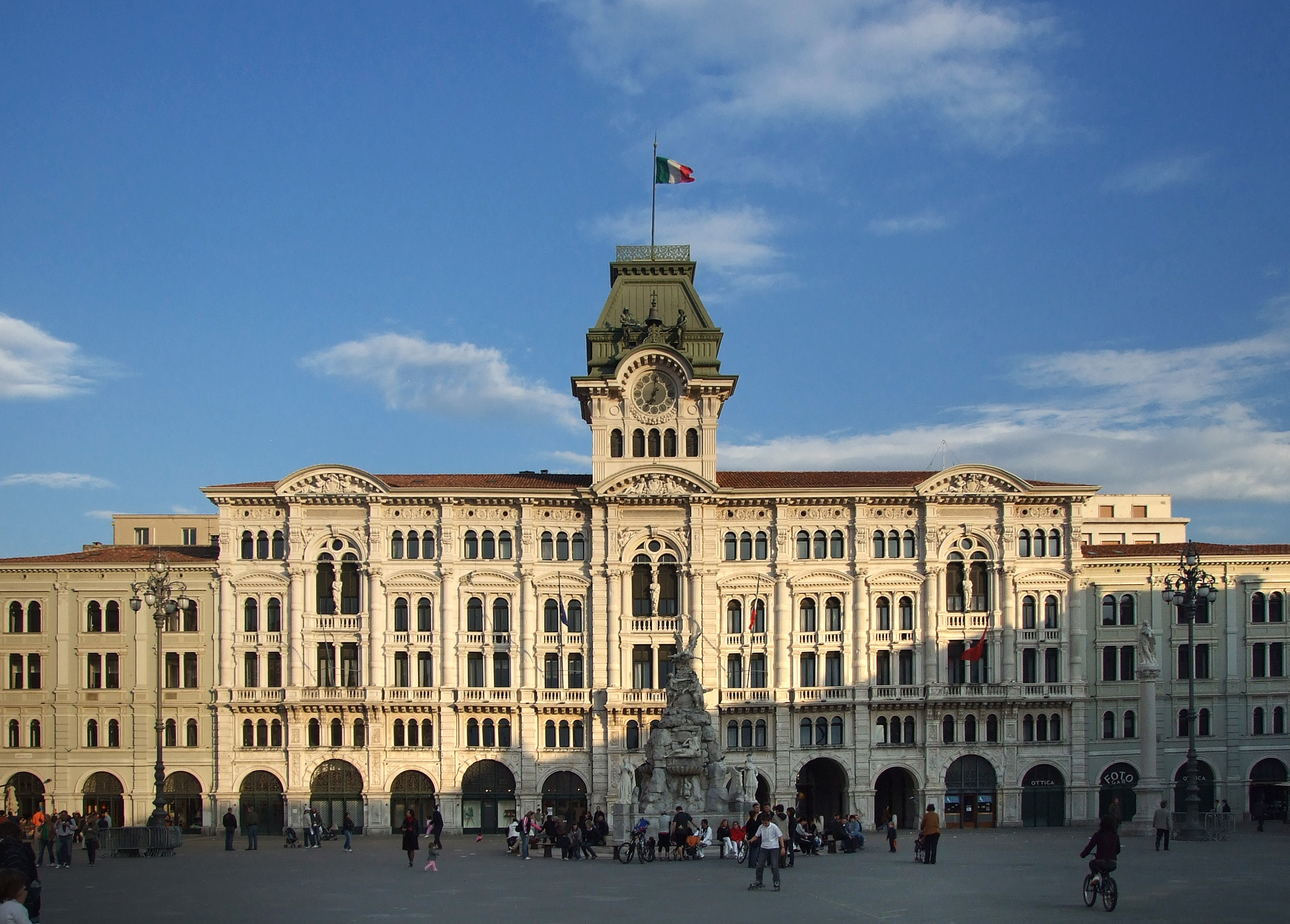
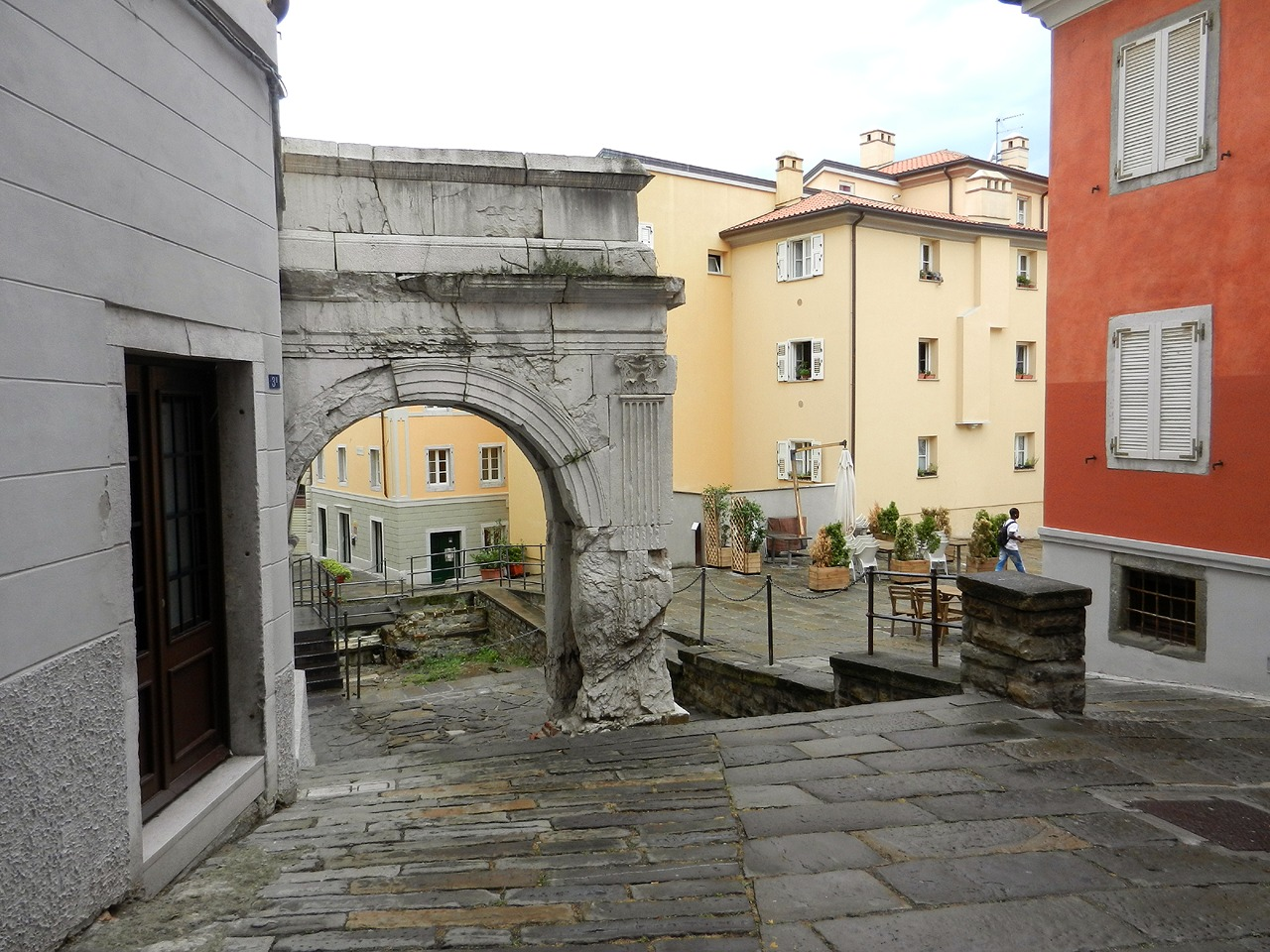
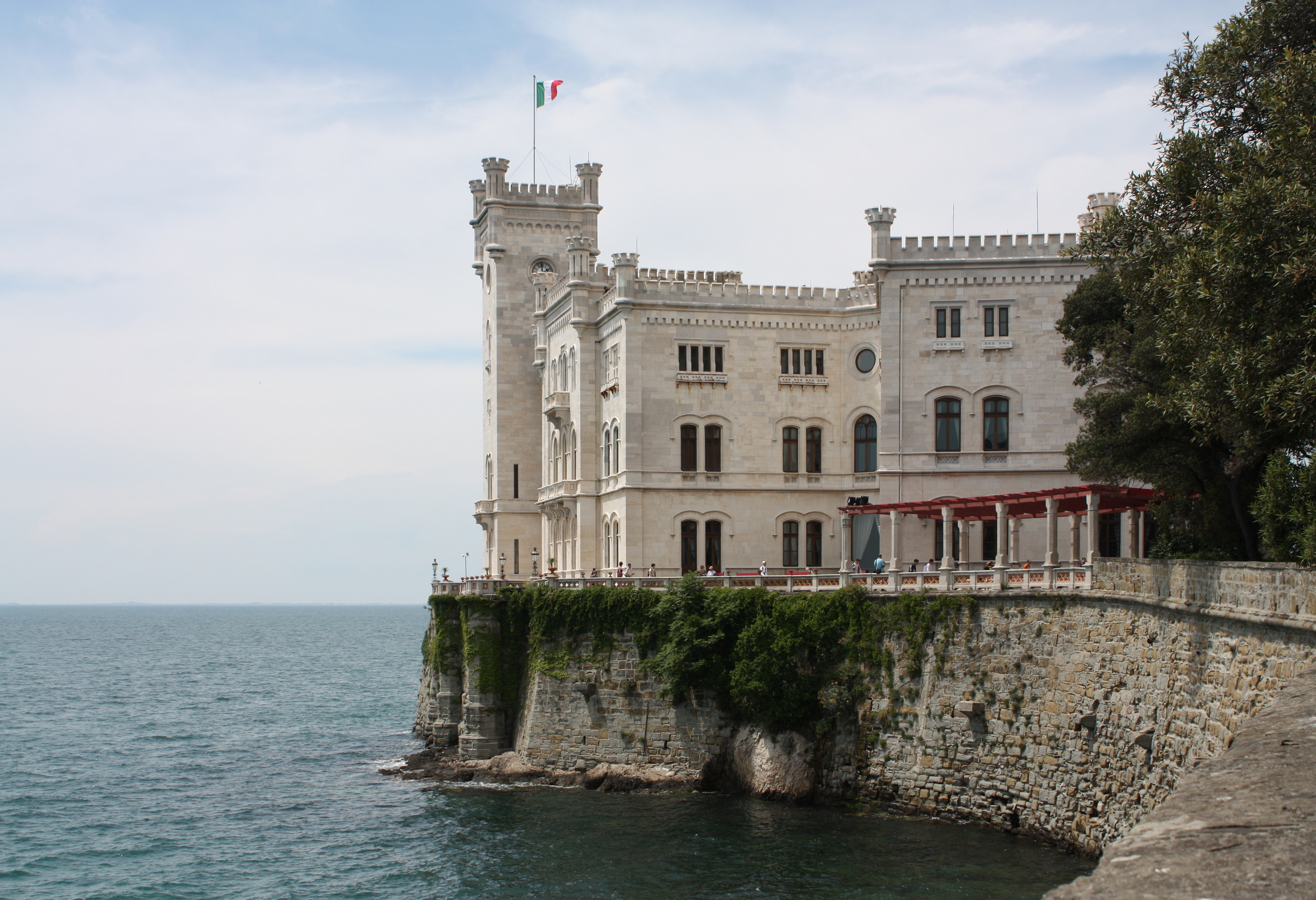
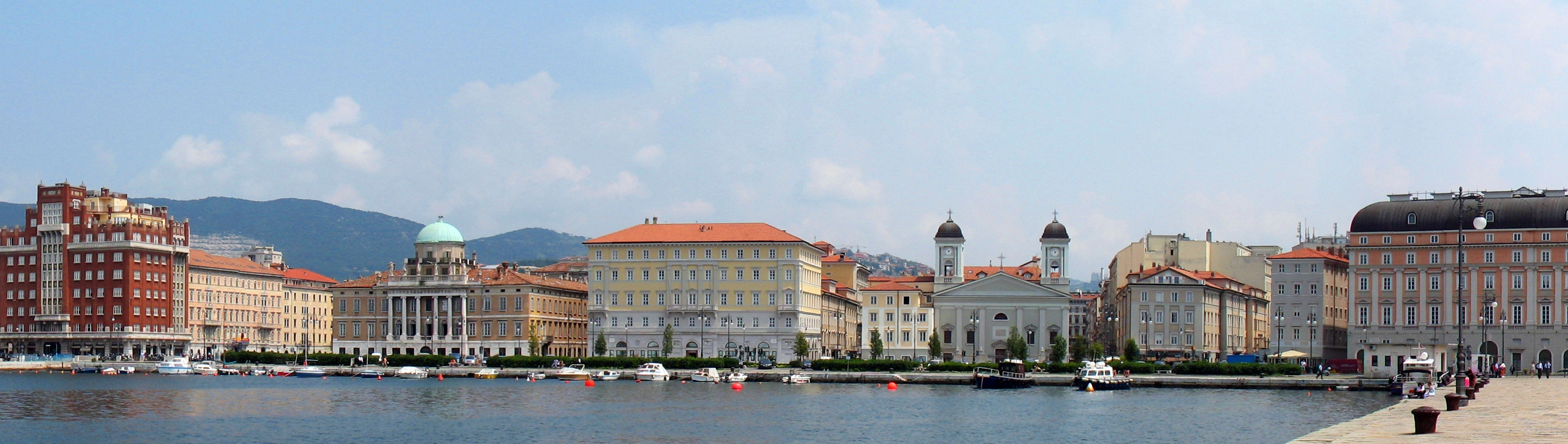
- Trieste skyline, seen from Castello di San Giusto Canal Grande Piazza Unità d'Italia Arco di Riccardo Miramare Castle View of Trieste from Molo Audace

- Flag Coat of arms

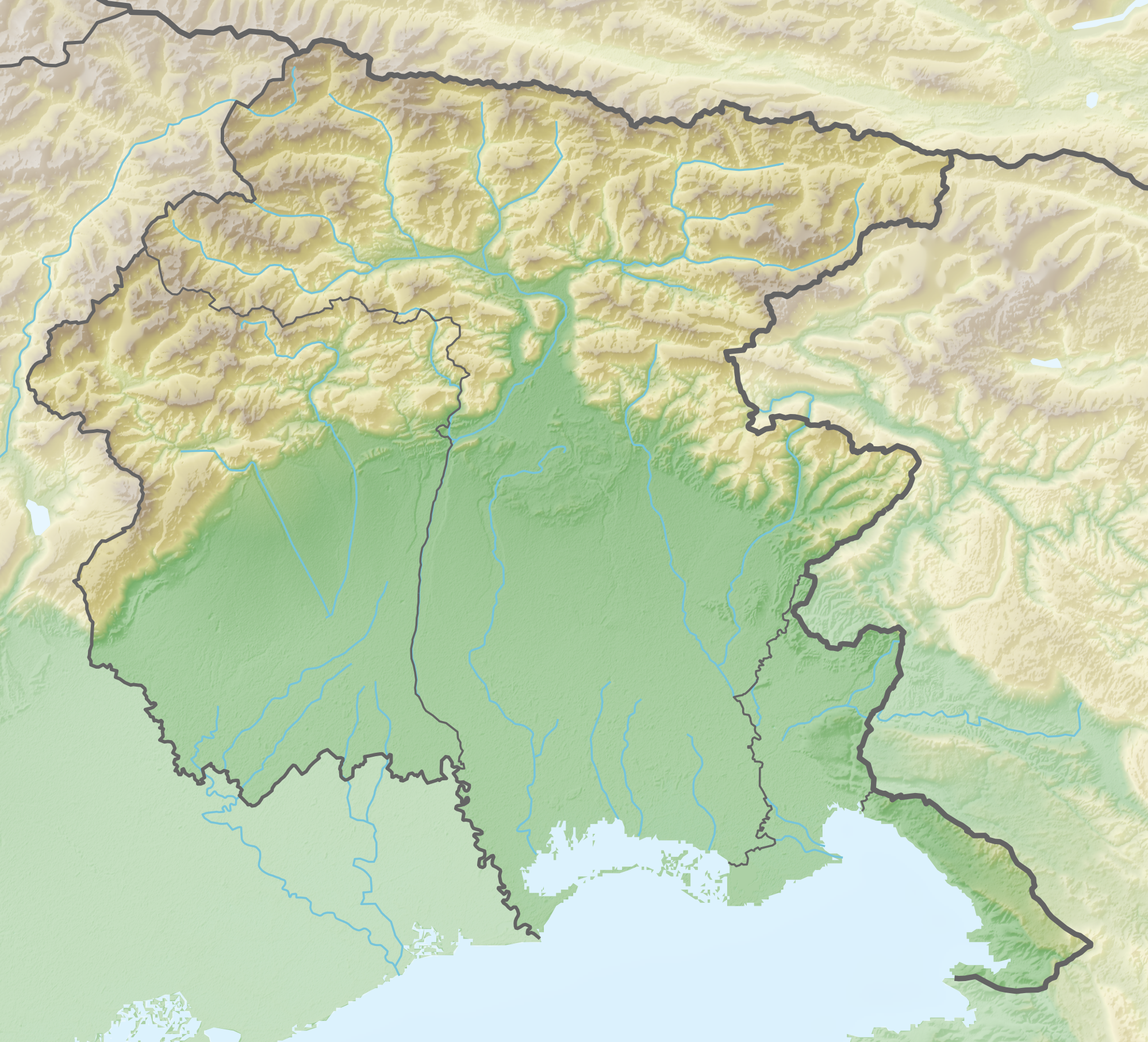
- Location within Italy Location within Friuli-Venezia Giulia
- Coordinates: 45°39′1″N 13°46′13″E
- Country: Italy
- Region: Friuli-Venezia Giulia
- Province: Trieste
- Frazioni: Banne (Bani), Barcola (Barkovlje), Basovizza (Bazovica), Borgo San Nazario, Cattinara (Katinara), Conconello (Ferlugi), Contovello (Kontovel), Grignano (Grljan), Gropada (Gropada), Longera (Lonjer), Miramare (Miramar), Opicina (Opčine), Padriciano (Padriče), Prosecco (Prosek), Santa Croce (Križ), Servola (Škedenj), Trebiciano (Trebče)

Government
  - Mayor: Roberto Dipiazza (FI)

Area
  - Total: 85.11 km^{2} (32.86 sq mi)
- Elevation: 2 m (6.6 ft)

Population (2026)
  - Total: 198,622
  - Density: 2,334/km^{2} (6,044/sq mi)
- Demonym(s): English: Triestine or Triestino; Italian: triestino (m.), triestina (f.)
- Time zone: UTC+1 (CET)
  - Summer (DST): UTC+2 (CEST)
- Postal code: 34100
- Dialing code: 040
- ISTAT code: 032006
- Patron saint: St. Justus of Trieste
- Saint day: 3 November
- Website: comune.trieste.it

Trieste (/triˈɛst/ tree-EST; Italian: [triˈɛste]; Friulian: Triest; Slovene: Trst) is a city and seaport in northeast Italy. It is the capital and largest city of the autonomous region of Friuli-Venezia Giulia, as well as of the regional decentralization entity of Trieste. As of 2026, it has a population of 198,622, making it the 17th-largest city in Italy.

Trieste is located at the head of the Gulf of Trieste, on a narrow strip of Italian territory lying between the Adriatic Sea and Slovenia; Slovenia lies close, at approximately 8 km (5 mi) east and 10–15 km (6–9 mi) southeast of the city, while Croatia is about 30 km (19 mi) to the south of the city. The city has a long coastline and is surrounded by grassland, forest, and karstic areas.

Trieste belonged, as Triest, to the Habsburg monarchy from 1382 until 1918. In the 19th century, the monarchy was one of the Great Powers of Europe and Trieste was its most important seaport. As a prosperous trading hub in the Mediterranean region, Trieste grew to become the fourth largest city of the Austro-Hungarian Empire (after Vienna, Budapest, and Prague). At the turn of the 20th century, it emerged as an important hub for literature and music. Trieste underwent an economic revival during the 1930s, and the Free Territory of Trieste became a major site of the struggle between the Eastern and Western blocs after the Second World War.

A deep-water port, Trieste is a maritime gateway for northern Italy, Germany, Austria and Central Europe. It is considered the end point of the maritime Silk Road, with connections to the Mediterranean, Suez Canal and Atlantic Ocean. Since the 1960s, Trieste has emerged as a prominent research location in Europe because of its many international organisations and institutions. The city lies at the intersection of Latin (due to Italy), Slavic (due to Slovenia and Croatia) and Germanic (due to Austria) cultures, where Central Europe meets the Mediterranean Sea, and is home to diverse ethnic groups and religious communities.

A scholarly area, Trieste has the highest percentage of researchers, per capita, in Europe. Città della Barcolana ("City of the Barcolana"), Città della bora ("City of the bora"), Città del vento ("City of Wind"), "Vienna by the sea" and "City of Coffee" are epithets used to describe Trieste.

== Etymology ==
The most likely origin is the word Tergeste – with the -est- suffix typical of Venetic – derived from the hypothetical Illyrian word *terg- "market" (etymologically cognate to the Albanian term treg 'market, marketplace' and reconstructed Proto-Slavic "*tъrgъ"). Roman authors also transliterated the name as Tergestum (according to Strabo, the name of the oppidum Tergestum originated from the three battles the Roman Army had to engage in with local tribes, "TER GESTUM [BELLUM]").

== History ==
Timeline of Trieste
Historical affiliations

Roman Empire, pre 395
Western Roman Empire, 395–476
Byzantine Empire, 476–567
Lombards, 567−788
Francia, 788−843
Middle Francia, 843−855
Patriarchate of Aquileia, 855–952
March of Verona, 952–1081
Patria del Friuli, 1081–1368
Republic of Venice, 1368–1369
Patriarchate of Aquileia, 1378–1382
Holy Roman Empire, 1382−1806
Austrian Empire, 1804–1809
First French Empire, 1809–1814
Austrian Empire, 1814–1867
Austria-Hungary, 1867−1922
Kingdom of Italy, 1922–1943
OZAK, 1943–1945
Allied Military Government, 1945–1947
Free Territory of Trieste, 1947–1954
Italy, 1954–present

=== Ancient history ===
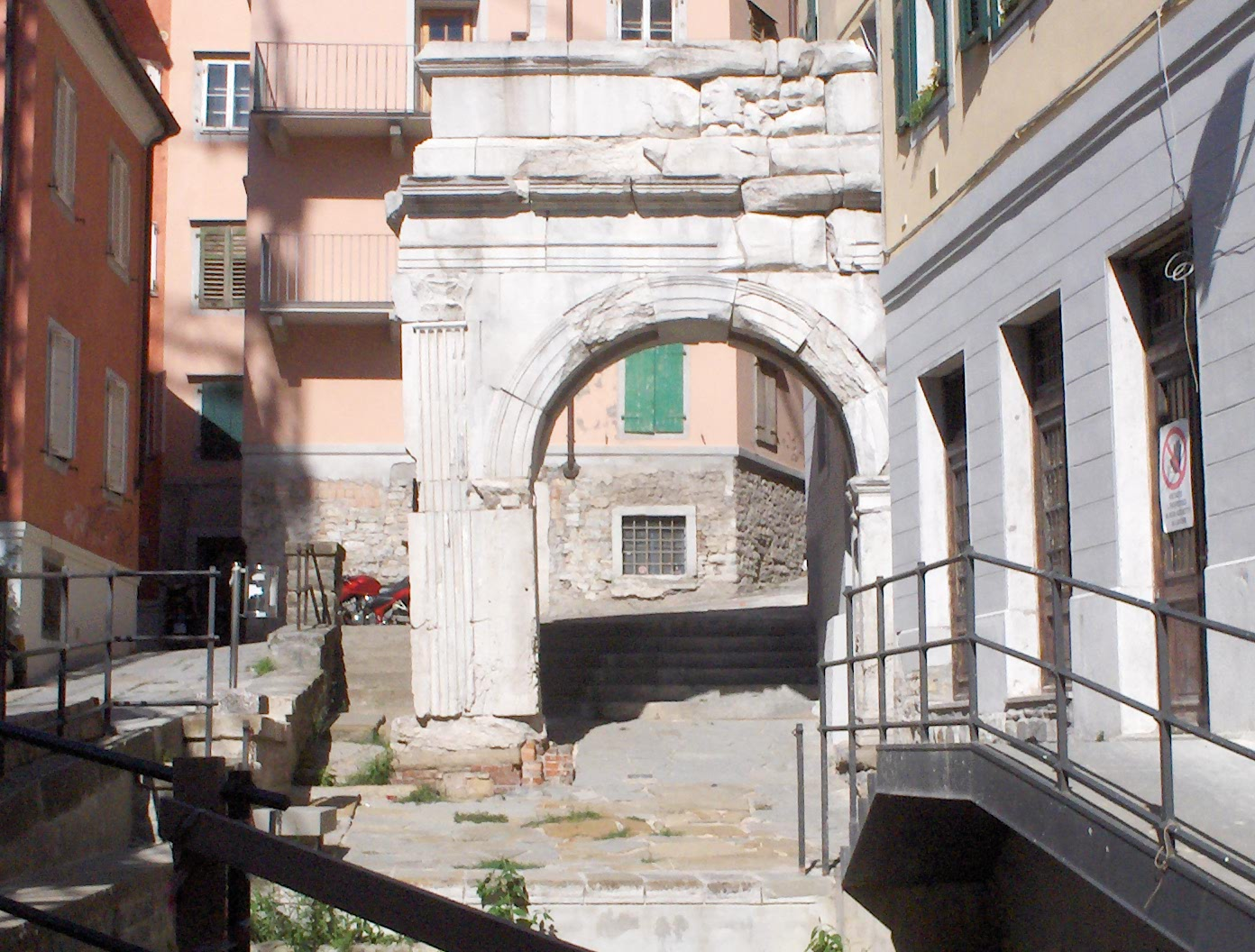
Arco di Riccardo, a Roman triumphal arch constructed from 33 to 32 BC

Since the second millennium BC, the location was an inhabited site. Originally an Illyrian settlement, the Veneti entered the region in the 10th–9th c. BC and seem to have given the town its name, Tergeste, because terg* is a Venetic word meaning market (q.v. Oderzo, whose ancient name was Opitergium). Later, the town was captured by the Carni, a tribe of the Eastern Alps, before becoming part of the Roman Republic in 177 BC during the Second Istrian War.

After being attacked by barbarians from the interior in 52 BC, and until 46 BC, it was granted the status of Roman colony under Julius Caesar, who recorded its name as Tergeste in Commentarii de Bello Gallico (51 BC), in which he recounts events of the Gallic Wars. Roman Tergeste flourished due to its position on the road from Aquileia, the main Roman city in the area, to Istria, and as a port, some ruins of which are still visible. Emperor Augustus built a line of walls around the city in 33–32 BC, while Trajan built a theatre in the 2nd century. At the same time, the citizens of the town were enrolled in the tribe Pupinia. In 27 BC, Trieste was incorporated in Regio X of Augustan Italia.

In the early Christian era Trieste continued to flourish. Between 138 and 161 AD, its territory was enlarged and nearby Carni and Catali were granted Roman citizenship by the Roman Senate and Emperor Antoninus Pius at the pleading of a leading Tergestine citizen, the quaestor urbanus, Fabius Severus.

Already at the time of the Roman Empire there was a fishing village called Vallicula ("small valley") in the Barcola area. Remains of richly decorated Roman villas, including wellness facilities, piers and extensive gardens, suggest that Barcola was already a place for relaxation among the Romans because of its favourable microclimate, as it was located directly on the sea and protected from the bora. At that time, Pliny the Elder mentioned the vines of the wine Pulcino ("Vinum Pucinum" – probably today's "Prosecco"), which were grown on the slopes.

=== Middle Ages ===
In 788, Trieste submitted to Charlemagne, who placed it under the authority of the count-bishop who in turn was subject to the Duke of Friùli.

During the 13th and 14th centuries, Trieste became a maritime trade rival to the Republic of Venice, which briefly occupied it in 1283–87, before coming under the patronage of the Patriarchate of Aquileia. After it committed a perceived offence against Venice, the Venetian State declared war against Trieste in July 1368 and by November had occupied the city. Venice intended to keep the city and began rebuilding its defences, but was forced to leave in 1372. Due to the Peace of Turin in 1381, Venice renounced its claim to Trieste and the leading citizens of Trieste petitioned Leopold III of Habsburg, Duke of Austria, to annex Trieste to his domains. The agreement of voluntary submission (dedizione) was signed at the castle of Graz on 30 September 1382.

The city maintained a high degree of autonomy under the Habsburgs, but was increasingly losing ground as a trade hub, both to Venice and to Ragusa. In 1463, a number of Istrian communities petitioned Venice to attack Trieste. Trieste was saved from utter ruin by the intervention of Pope Pius II who had previously been bishop of Trieste. However, Venice limited Trieste's territory to three miles (4.8 kilometres) outside the city. Trieste would be assaulted again in 1468–1469 by Holy Roman Emperor Frederick III. His sack of the city is remembered as the "Destruction of Trieste". He then restored the city walls for the fourth time. Trieste was fortunate to be spared another sack in 1470 by the Ottomans who burned the village of Prosecco, only about 5.3 miles (8.5 kilometres) from Trieste, while on their way to attack Friuli.

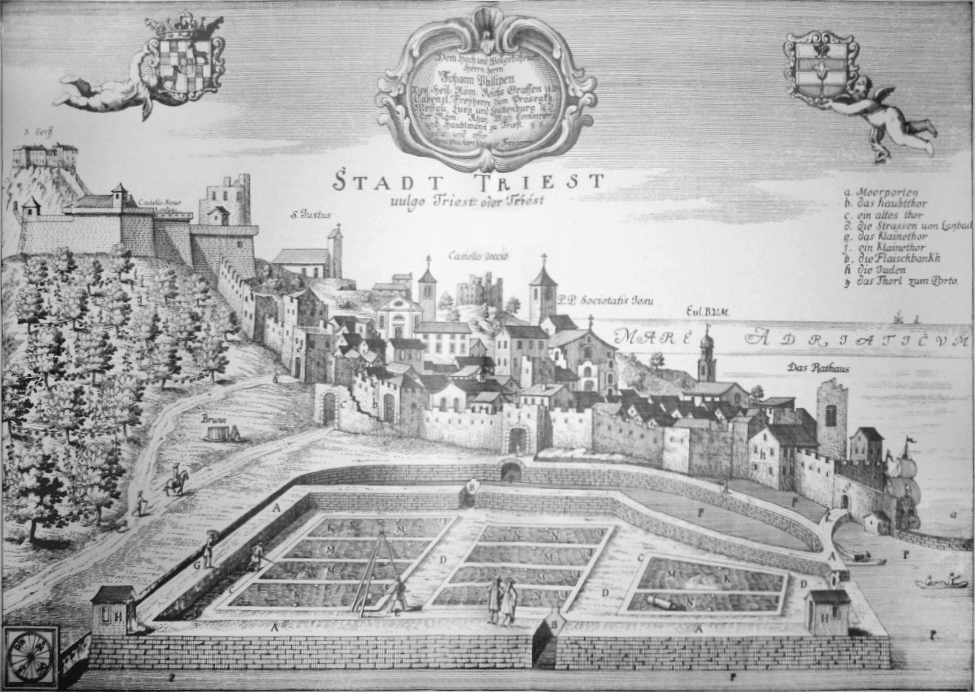
Trieste in the 17th century, in a contemporary image by the Carniolan historian Johann Weikhard von Valvasor

=== Early modern period ===
Following an unsuccessful Habsburg invasion of Venice in the prelude to the 1508–16 War of the League of Cambrai, the Venetians occupied Trieste again in 1508, and were allowed to keep the city under the terms of the peace treaty. However, the Habsburg Empire recovered Trieste a little over one year later, when the conflict resumed. By the 18th century Trieste became an important port and commercial hub for the Austrians. In 1719, it was granted status as a free port within the Habsburg Empire by Emperor Charles VI, and remained a free port until 1 July 1791. The reign of his successor, Maria Theresa of Austria, marked the beginning of a very prosperous era for the city. Serbs settled Trieste largely in the 18th and 19th centuries, and they soon formed an influential and rich community within the city, as a number of Serbian traders came into ownership of many important businesses and built palaces across Trieste.

=== 19th century ===
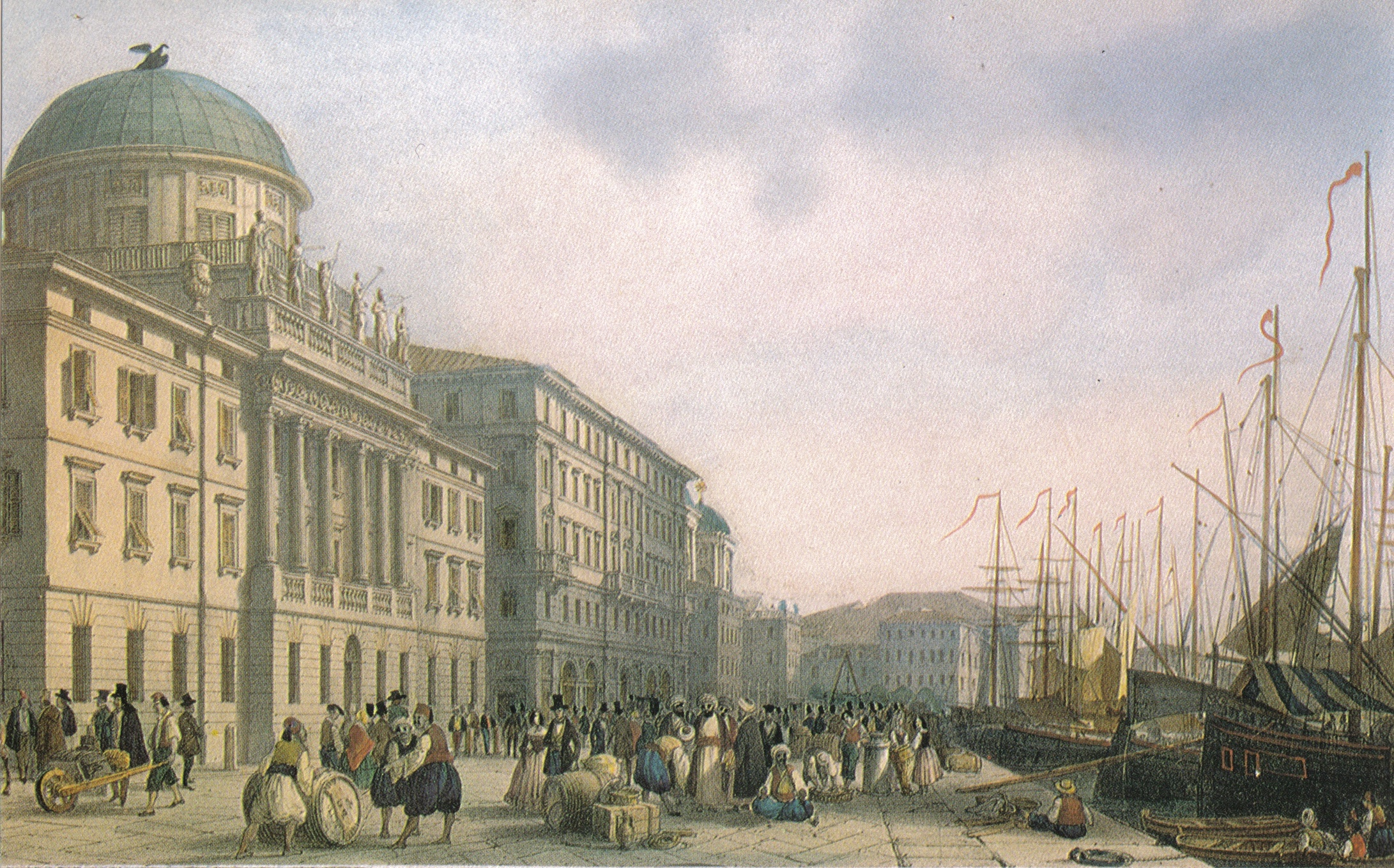
Palazzo Carciotti in Trieste, c. 1850

In the following decades, Trieste was briefly occupied by troops of the French Empire during the Napoleonic Wars on several occasions, in 1797, 1805 and 1809. From 1809 to 1813, Trieste was annexed into the Illyrian Provinces, interrupting its status of free port and losing its autonomy. The municipal autonomy was not restored after the return of the city to the Austrian Empire in 1813 when it was recaptured by an Anglo-Austrian force.

Trieste continued to prosper as the Free Imperial City of Trieste (German: Reichsunmittelbare Stadt Triest), a status that granted economic freedom, but limited its political self-government. The city's role as Austria's main trading port and shipbuilding centre was later emphasised by the foundation of the merchant shipping line Austrian Lloyd in 1836, whose headquarters stood at the corner of the Piazza Grande and Sanità (today's Piazza Unità d'Italia). By 1913, Austrian Lloyd had a fleet of 62 ships totalling 236,000 tonnes. With the introduction of constitutionalism in the Austrian Empire in 1860, the municipal autonomy of the city was restored, with Trieste becoming capital of the Austrian Littoral crown land (German: Österreichisches Küstenland).

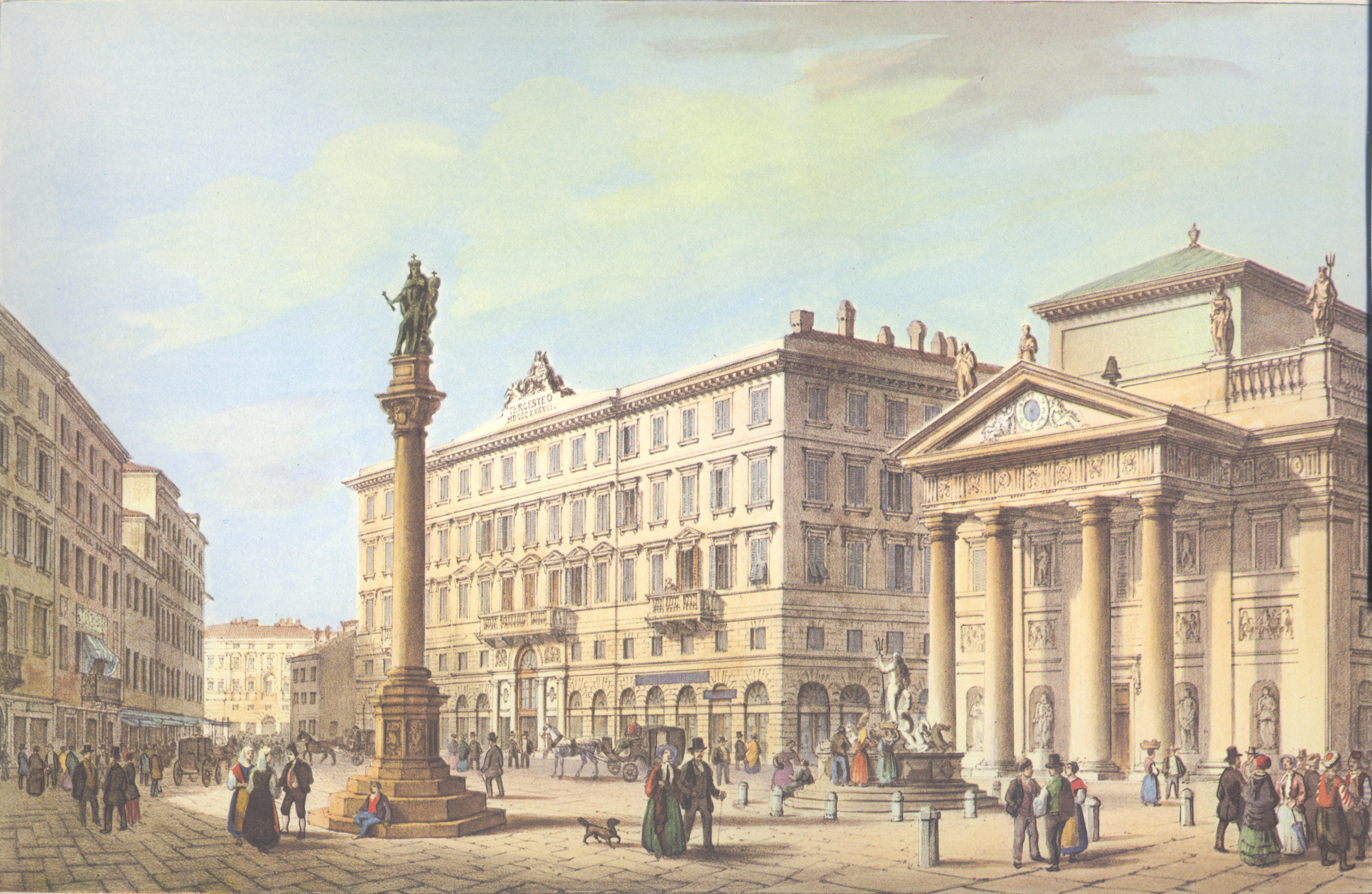
The Stock Exchange Square in 1854

With anti-clericalism on the rise in the rest of the Italian peninsula due to the Kingdom of Piedmont-Sardinia's bellicose policies towards the church and its estates, Pope Leo XIII at times considered moving his residence to Trieste or Salzburg. However, Emperor Franz Joseph rejected the idea. Trieste, along with Rijeka (Fiume), served as an important base for the Imperial-Royal Navy, which in the first decade of the 20th century embarked on a major modernisation programme. With the construction of the Austrian Southern Railway, the first major railway in the Empire, in 1857, Trieste acquired a significant role in the trade of coal.

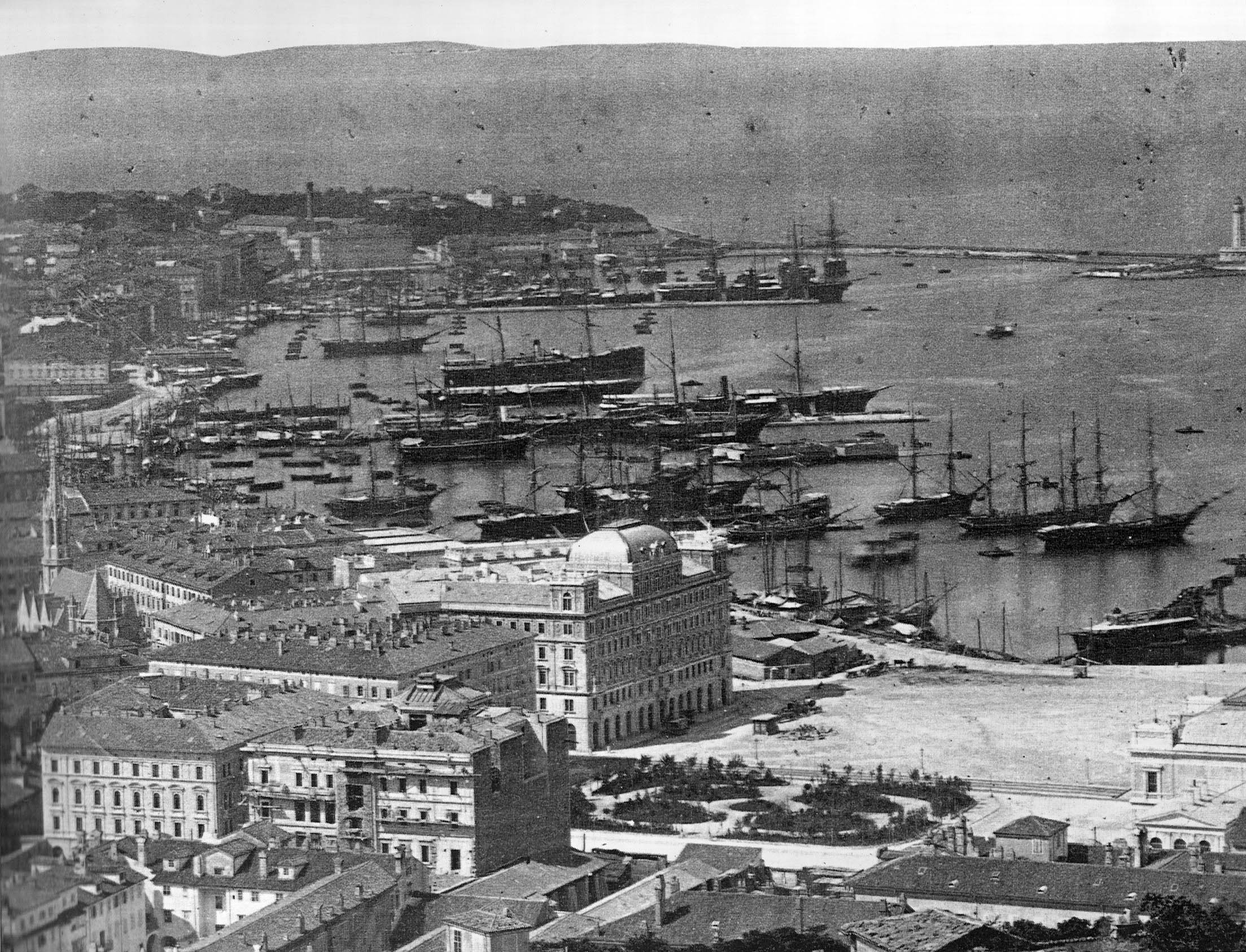
A view of Trieste in 1885

Trieste had long been home to Italian irredentist sentiment, as evidenced by the activity at Caffè Tommaseo. In 1882 this fervour culminated in an attempted assassination of Emperor Franz Joseph at the hands of Wilhem Oberdank (Guglielmo Oberdan), while His Majesty was visiting the city. The perpetrator was arrested, tried, found guilty and ultimately sentenced to death. His legacy was regarded as worthy of martyrdom status by fellow irredentists, while monarchical elements regarded his actions as ignominious. The Emperor, who went on to reign for thirty-four more years, never again visited Trieste.

=== 20th century ===
At the beginning of the 20th century, Trieste was a bustling cosmopolitan city frequented by artists and philosophers. James Joyce was a long-stay tourist between 1904 and 1915. Joyce worked on Dubliners and Ulysses while in Trieste. His students included Italo Svevo, and a bookshop run by Umberto Saba was near Joyce's apartment. Other authors with roots in Trieste include Claudio Magris, Jan Morris, Fulvio Tomizza, Enzo Bettiza, Susanna Tamaro, and Ernesto Nathan Rogers. Sigmund Freud, Zofka Kveder, Dragotin Kette, Ivan Cankar, and Scipio Slataper have also been associated with Trieste. The city was the major port on the Austrian Riviera, a term used in tourist marketing.

=== World War I, annexation to Italy and Fascist era ===
Italy, in return for entering World War I on the side of the Allied Powers, had been promised substantial territorial gains, which included the former Austrian Littoral and western Inner Carniola. Italy therefore annexed the city of Trieste at the end of the war, in accordance with the provisions of the 1915 Treaty of London and the Italian-Yugoslav 1920 Treaty of Rapallo.

In the late 1920s, following Italian fascists burning down of the Slovene cultural centre (now the Trieste National Hall) in July 1920, the Slovene militant anti-fascist organisation TIGR carried out several bomb attacks in the city centre. In 1930 and 1941, two trials of Slovene activists were held in Trieste by the fascist Special Tribunal for the Security of the State. During the 1920s and 1930s, several monumental buildings were built in the Fascist architectural style, including the University of Trieste and the almost 70 m (229.66 ft) tall Victory Lighthouse (Faro della Vittoria), which became a city landmark. The economy improved in the late 1930s, and several large infrastructure projects were carried out.

=== World War II and aftermath ===
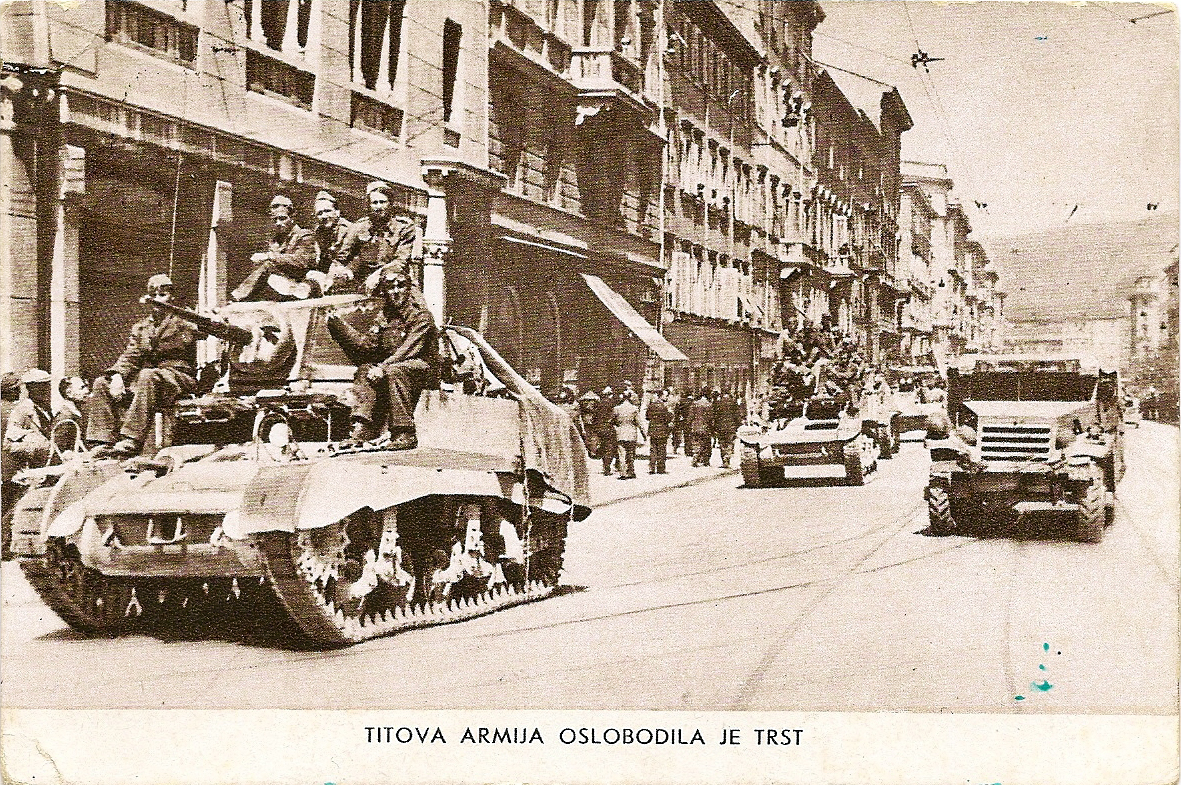
Yugoslav Army entering Trieste (the caption reads: "Tito's Army liberated Trieste")

Following the trisection of Slovenia, starting from the winter of 1941, the first Slovene Partisans appeared in Trieste province, although the resistance movement did not become active in the city itself until late 1943.

After the Italian armistice in September 1943, the city was occupied by Wehrmacht troops. Trieste became nominally part of the newly constituted Italian Social Republic, but it was de facto ruled by Germany, who created the Operation Zone of the Adriatic Littoral (OZAK) out of former Italian north-eastern regions, with Trieste as the administrative centre. The new administrative entity was headed by Friedrich Rainer, Gauleiter of Carinthia, named supreme commissary of the AK zone. A semblance of indigenous Italian rule was kept in the form of Cesare Pagnini, mayor of Trieste, but every civil official was assigned a representative of the supreme commissar in the form of a Deutscher Berater (German Adviser). Under German occupation, the only concentration camp with a crematorium on Italian soil was built in a suburb of Trieste, at the Risiera di San Sabba on 4 April 1944. From 20 October 1943, to the spring of 1944, around 25,000 Jews and partisans were interrogated and tortured in the Risiera. Three to four thousand of them were murdered here by shooting, beating or in gas vans. Most were imprisoned before being transferred to other concentration camps.

The city saw intense Italian and Yugoslav partisan activity and suffered from Allied bombings, over 20 air raids in 1944–1945, targeting the oil refineries, port and marshalling yard but causing considerable collateral damage to the city and 651 deaths among the population. The worst raid took place on 10 June 1944, when a hundred tons of bombs dropped by 40 USAAF bombers, targeting the oil refineries, resulted in the destruction of 250 buildings, damage to another 700 and 463 victims.

==== Occupation by Yugoslav Partisans ====
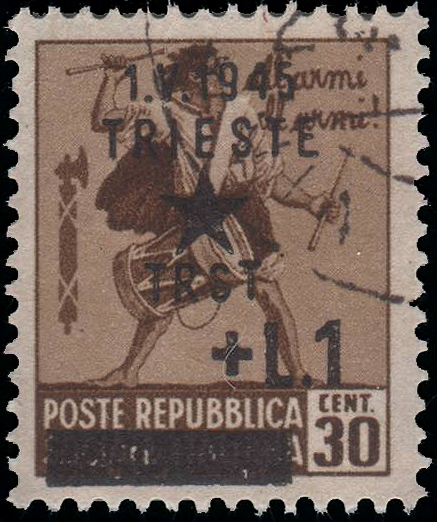
A postage stamp issued by the Italian Social Republic with a Yugoslav liberation overprint

On 30 April 1945, the Slovenian and Italian anti-Fascist Osvobodilna fronta (OF) and National Liberation Committee (Comitato di Liberazione Nazionale, or CLN) of Edoardo Marzari and Antonio Fonda Savio, made up of approximately 3,500 volunteers, incited a riot against the Nazi occupiers. On 1 May Allied members of the Yugoslav Partisans' 8th Dalmatian Corps took over most of the city, except for the courts and the castle of San Giusto, where the German garrisons refused to surrender to anyone but the New Zealanders, due to the Partisans' reputation for shooting German and Italian prisoners of war. The 2nd New Zealand Division under General Freyberg continued to advance towards Trieste along Route 14 around the northern coast of the Adriatic sea and arrived in the city the following day (see official histories The Italian Campaign and Through the Venetian Line). The German forces surrendered on the evening of 2 May, but were then turned over to the Yugoslav forces.

The Yugoslavs held full control of the city until 12 June, a period known in Italian historiography as the "forty days of Trieste". During this period, hundreds of local Italians and anti-Communist Slovenes were arrested by the Yugoslav authorities, and many of them were never seen again. Some were interned in Yugoslav internment camps (in particular at Borovnica, Slovenia), while others were murdered on the Karst Plateau. British Field Marshal Harold Alexander condemned the Yugoslav military occupation, stating that "Marshal Tito's apparent intention to establish his claims by force of arms...[is] all too reminiscent of Hitler, Mussolini and Japan. It is to prevent such actions that we have been fighting this war." In this most turbulent of periods, the city saw a thorough reorganisation of the political-administrative system: the Yugoslav Fourth Army, to which many figures of prominence were attached (including Edvard Kardelj, a sign of just how important the Isonzo front was in Yugoslav aims) established a provisional Military Command in the occupied areas. Fully understanding the precarious position it found itself in, the Yugoslav Command undertook great efforts to claim the success for itself, faced with the presence of the 2nd New Zealand Division under General Bernard Freyberg in Trieste, which could undermine, as it did, postwar claims of sovereignty and control over the seaport. The journalist Geoffrey Cox wrote that it was "the first major confrontation of the Cold War" and was "the one corner of Europe where no demarcation line had been agreed upon in advance by the Allies." To this effect, a Tanjug Agency communiqué stated: "The seaport of Trieste, Monfalcone and Gorizia could not be occupied by the above mentioned division [the New Zealand Division] as these cities had already been liberated...by the Yugoslav army...It is true that some Allied forces have without our permission entered into the above mentioned cities which might have undesirable consequences unless this misunderstanding is promptly settled by mutual agreement."

==== A city in limbo (1945–1947) ====
After an agreement between the Yugoslav leader Josip Broz Tito and Field Marshal Alexander, the Yugoslav forces withdrew from Trieste, which came under a joint British-U.S. military administration. The Julian March was divided by the Morgan Line between Anglo-American and Yugoslav military administration until September 1947 when the Paris Peace Treaty established the Free Territory of Trieste. The effective turning point for Trieste's fortunes had already been established, though: President Truman's stipulations, later named the Truman Doctrine, in all but name had sealed the status quo, formalised only in the above-mentioned treaty, one that proved to be a careful balancing act between Yugoslav demands, Italian claims and international aims toward the Adriatic gulf and Eastern Europe in general. Questions arose on the structure of government as soon and even earlier than the signing of the treaty, with neither Italy nor Yugoslavia willing to recognise a joint governor. Initially, the newly established Allied Military Government (AMG) found it difficult to exercise its authority over the newly administered territories (the Italian majority provinces of Trieste, Gorizia and Pola), because of a rooted communist presence, especially in the countryside. This state of affairs did not change until a formal peace treaty with Italy had been signed, granting the AMG the full powers to administer justice and re-establish law and order in those areas under its administration. Replacing the People's Militia, the AMG recruited a civilian police force from the indigenous population along the Anglo-Saxon police model. This exercise of jurisdiction was thus articulated: pursuant to Proclamation No. 1, three tiers of tribunals were established: the Summary Military Courts, with jurisdiction over petty crime, the Superior Military Courts, which could impose punishments not exceeding 10 years imprisonment, and the General Military Court, which could impose the death penalty. Civil courts, as modelled on the Kingdom of Italy's code, were, pursuant to General Order No. 6, re-established 12 July 1945, but the Slovene minority was given the right to be heard, and for proceedings to be, in their own language.

=== Zone A of the Free Territory of Trieste (1947–1954) ===
Trieste and Zone A/B

In 1947, Trieste was declared an independent city state under the protection of the United Nations as the Free Territory of Trieste. The territory was divided into two zones, A and B, along the Morgan Line established in 1945.

From 1947 to 1954, Zone A was occupied and governed by the Allied Military Government, composed of the American Trieste United States Troops (TRUST), commanded by Major General Bryant E. Moore, the commanding general of the American 88th Infantry Division, and the "British Element Trieste Forces" (BETFOR), commanded by Sir Terence Airey, who were the joint forces commander and also the military governors.

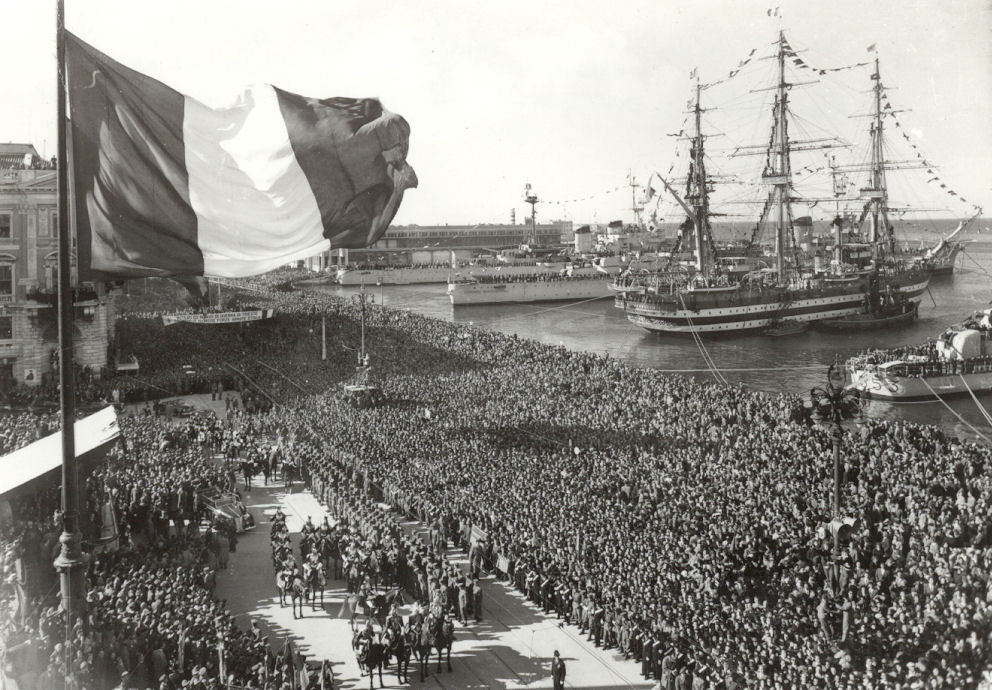
Cheering crowd for the return of Trieste to Italy on 4 November 1954

Zone A covered almost the same area of the current Italian Province of Trieste, except for four small villages south of Muggia (see below), which were given to Yugoslavia after the dissolution of the Free Territory in 1954. Occupied Zone B, which was under the administration of Miloš Stamatović, then a colonel in the Yugoslav People's Army, was composed of the north-westernmost portion of the Istrian peninsula, between the Mirna River and the cape Debeli Rtič.

In 1954, in accordance with the Memorandum of London, the vast majority of Zone A—including the city of Trieste—joined Italy, whereas Zone B and four villages from Zone A (Plavje, Spodnje Škofije, Hrvatini, and Elerji) became part of Yugoslavia, divided between Slovenia and Croatia. The final border line with Yugoslavia and the status of the ethnic minorities in the areas was settled bilaterally in 1975 with the Treaty of Osimo. This line now constitutes the border between Italy and Slovenia.

== Geography ==
Trieste is located in the northernmost part of the high Adriatic, in northeastern Italy, near the border with Slovenia. The city lies on the Gulf of Trieste. Built mostly on a hillside, Trieste's urban territory lies at the foot of an imposing escarpment that comes down abruptly from the Karst Plateau towards the sea. The karst hills delimiting the city reach an elevation of 458 metres (1,503 feet) above sea level. It lies at the junction point of the Italian geographical region, the Balkan Peninsula, and Mitteleuropan Area.

=== Climate ===
Trieste's climate is humid subtropical (Köppen: Cfa, Trewartha: Cf), with cool winters and hot summers. On average, relative humidity is low (~ 65%), while only three months (January, March and July) receive slightly less than 60 mm (2 in) of precipitation.

Trieste, like the Istrian Peninsula, has evenly distributed rainfall above 900 mm (35 in) in total; it is noteworthy that no true summer drought occurs. Snow occurs on average 2 days per year.

Winter highs are lower than the average temperatures in the Mediterranean zone. Two basic weather patterns alternate — sunny, windy and often cold days frequently cause a northeastern wind called bora, and rainy days with temperatures of about 6 to 11 °C (43 to 52 °F).

Summer is very warm with highs of about 29 °C (84 °F) and lows above 20 °C (68 °F), with hot nights being influenced by the warm seawater. The highest temperature of the last 30 years is 40.1 °C (104 °F) in 2020, whereas the absolute minimum was −7.9 °C (18 °F) in 1996.

The Trieste area is divided into 8a–10a zones according to USDA hardiness zoning; Villa Opicina (320 to 420 MSL), with an 8a zone in the upper suburban area down to a 10a zone in the shielded and windproof valleys close to the Adriatic sea.

The climate can be severely affected by the bora, a very dry and usually cool north-to-northeast katabatic wind that can last for some days and reach speeds of up to 140 km/h (87 mph) on the piers of the port, thus sometimes lowering temperatures to subzero levels.

Climate data for Trieste (1991-2020 normals and extremes)
Month	Jan	Feb	Mar	Apr	May	Jun	Jul	Aug	Sep	Oct	Nov	Dec	Year
Record high °C (°F)	18.2 (64.8)	18.2 (64.8)	23.8 (74.8)	29.8 (85.6)	32.2 (90.0)	36.8 (98.2)	37.4 (99.3)	38.0 (100.4)	33.8 (92.8)	30.8 (87.4)	24.4 (75.9)	18.7 (65.7)	38.0 (100.4)
Mean daily maximum °C (°F)	9.0 (48.2)	9.7 (49.5)	13.5 (56.3)	17.7 (63.9)	22.3 (72.1)	26.5 (79.7)	29.1 (84.4)	29.1 (84.4)	24.3 (75.7)	19.1 (66.4)	14.3 (57.7)	10.2 (50.4)	18.7 (65.7)
Daily mean °C (°F)	6.3 (43.3)	6.7 (44.1)	10.0 (50.0)	14.0 (57.2)	18.5 (65.3)	22.6 (72.7)	25.0 (77.0)	25.0 (77.0)	20.5 (68.9)	15.9 (60.6)	11.5 (52.7)	7.5 (45.5)	15.3 (59.5)
Mean daily minimum °C (°F)	4.2 (39.6)	4.2 (39.6)	7.1 (44.8)	10.6 (51.1)	14.9 (58.8)	18.9 (66.0)	21.0 (69.8)	21.2 (70.2)	17.2 (63.0)	13.2 (55.8)	9.2 (48.6)	5.3 (41.5)	12.3 (54.1)
Record low °C (°F)	−6.8 (19.8)	−7.2 (19.0)	−6.4 (20.5)	1.2 (34.2)	0.0 (32.0)	8.4 (47.1)	10.0 (50.0)	11.0 (51.8)	9.2 (48.6)	0.0 (32.0)	−1.3 (29.7)	−7.3 (18.9)	−7.3 (18.9)
Average precipitation mm (inches)	51.5 (2.03)	64.7 (2.55)	56.6 (2.23)	69.4 (2.73)	80.9 (3.19)	74.9 (2.95)	55.6 (2.19)	74.9 (2.95)	108.3 (4.26)	113.3 (4.46)	117.5 (4.63)	82.5 (3.25)	950.1 (37.42)
Average snowfall cm (inches)	1.0 (0.4)	1.4 (0.6)	0.6 (0.2)	0.0 (0.0)	0.0 (0.0)	0.0 (0.0)	0.0 (0.0)	0.0 (0.0)	0.0 (0.0)	0.0 (0.0)	0.0 (0.0)	0.9 (0.4)	3.9 (1.6)
Average precipitation days (≥ 1.0 mm)	6.33	6.41	6.03	8.34	8.50	7.63	5.80	6.55	7.79	8.97	10.46	7.69	90.5
Average snowy days	1.2	1.0	0.6	0	0	0	0	0	0	0	0	0.7	3.5
Average relative humidity (%)	67.54	65.35	63.31	63.82	64.70	64.76	62.19	62.98	64.60	68.51	69.75	66.96	65.37
Average dew point °C (°F)	0.3 (32.5)	0.1 (32.2)	2.7 (36.9)	6.7 (44.1)	11.3 (52.3)	15.2 (59.4)	16.8 (62.2)	16.9 (62.4)	13.1 (55.6)	9.7 (49.5)	6.0 (42.8)	1.3 (34.3)	8.3 (47.0)
Mean monthly sunshine hours	102.3	124.7	155.4	177.0	231.6	250.1	297.9	272.3	200.9	148.0	97.9	90.3	2,148.4
Source 1: NOAA (Sun 1981-2010)
Source 2: Weather Atlas(snow),

== Demographics ==
Historical population
Year	Pop.	±%
1921	239,558	—
1931	250,170	+4.4%
1936	248,307	−0.7%
1951	272,522	+9.8%
1961	272,723	+0.1%
1971	271,879	−0.3%
1981	252,369	−7.2%
1991	231,100	−8.4%
2001	211,184	−8.6%
2011	202,123	−4.3%
2021	199,015	−1.5%
Source: ISTAT

ISTAT 2020 & 2026
	Trieste	Italy
Median age	49 years	45.7 years
Under 18 years old	12.8%	14.6%
Over 65 years old	28.6%	25.1%
Foreign-born	17.6%	11.8%
Births/1,000 people	3.1	6.0
Deaths/1,000 people	13.5	11.1
Natural increase	-7.4	-5.0

As of 2026, the population is 198,622, of which 48.3% are males, and 51.7% are females. Minors make up 12.8% of the population, and seniors make up 28.6%.

Since the annexation to Italy after World War I, there has been a steady decline in Trieste's demographic weight compared to other cities. In 1911, Trieste was the fourth-largest city in the Austro-Hungarian Empire (third-largest in the Austrian part of the Monarchy). In 1921, Trieste was the eighth-largest city in the country, in 1961 the 12th-largest, in 1981 the 14th-largest, while it is now 15th.

Trieste is predominantly Roman Catholic.

=== Immigration ===
Foreign-born population (2025)
Country of birth	Population
Serbia	5,072
Romania	2,496
Croatia	2,460
Kosovo	2,130
Ukraine	1,566
Albania	1,377
Pakistan	1,284
Slovenia	1,178
Bosnia and Herzegovina	976
China	790
Moldova	737
North Macedonia	671
Colombia	596
Argentina	594
Senegal	590

As of 2025, immigrants make up 17.6% of the population. The 5 largest foreign countries of birth are Serbia, Romania, Croatia, Kosovo, and Ukraine.

=== Languages ===
A Triestine speaker

The particular dialect of Trieste, called Tergestino, spoken until the beginning of the 19th century, was surpassed in relevance by the Triestine dialect of Venetian (a language deriving directly from Vulgar Latin) and other languages, including standard Italian, Slovene, and German. While Triestine and Italian were spoken by the largest part of the population, German was the language of the Austrian bureaucracy and Slovene was predominantly spoken in the surrounding villages. From the last decades of the 19th century, the number of speakers of Slovene grew steadily, reaching 25% of the overall population of Trieste in 1911.

According to the 1911 census, the proportion of Slovene speakers grew to 12.6% in the city centre (15.9% counting only Austrian citizens), 47.6% in the suburbs (53% counting only Austrian citizens), and 90.5% in the surroundings. They were the largest ethnic group in nine of the nineteen urban neighbourhoods of Trieste, and represented a majority in seven of them. The Italian speakers, on the other hand, made up 60.1% of the population in the city centre, 38.1% in the suburbs, and 6.0% in the surroundings. They were the largest linguistic group in ten of the nineteen urban neighbourhoods, and represented the majority in seven of them (including all six in the city centre). German speakers amounted to 5% of the city's population, with the highest proportions in the city centre.

The city also had several other smaller ethnic communities, including Croats, Czechs, Istro-Romanians, Serbs and Greeks, who mostly assimilated either into the Italian or the Slovene-speaking communities. Altogether, in 1911, 51.83% of the population of the municipality of Trieste spoke Italian, 24.79% spoke Slovene, 5.2% spoke German, 1% spoke Croatian, 0.3% spoke "other languages", and 16.8% were foreigners, including a further 12.9% Italians (immigrants from the Kingdom of Italy and thus considered separately from Triestine Italians) and 1.6% Hungarians.

By 1971, following the emigration of Slovenes to neighbouring Slovenia and the immigration of Italians from other regions (and from Yugoslav-annexed Istria) to Trieste, the percentage of Italian speakers had risen to 91.8%, and that of Slovenian speakers had dwindled to 5.7%.

Today, the dominant local dialect of Trieste is "Triestine" (triestin, pronounced [tɾi.esˈtiŋ]), a form of Venetian. This dialect and official Italian are spoken in the city, while Slovene is spoken in some of the immediate suburbs. There are also small numbers of Serbo-Croatian, German, Greek, and Hungarian speakers.

== Government ==
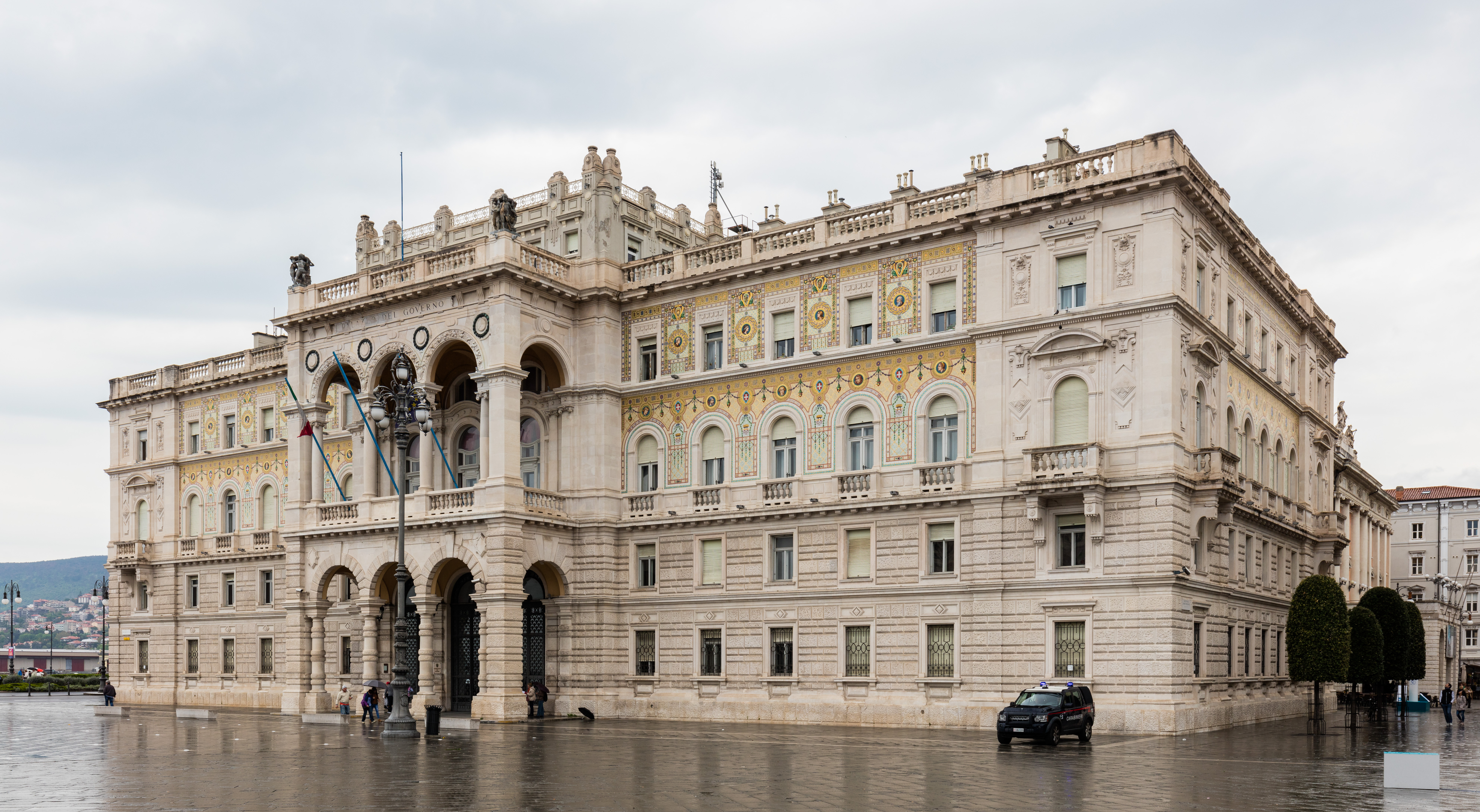
Government palace

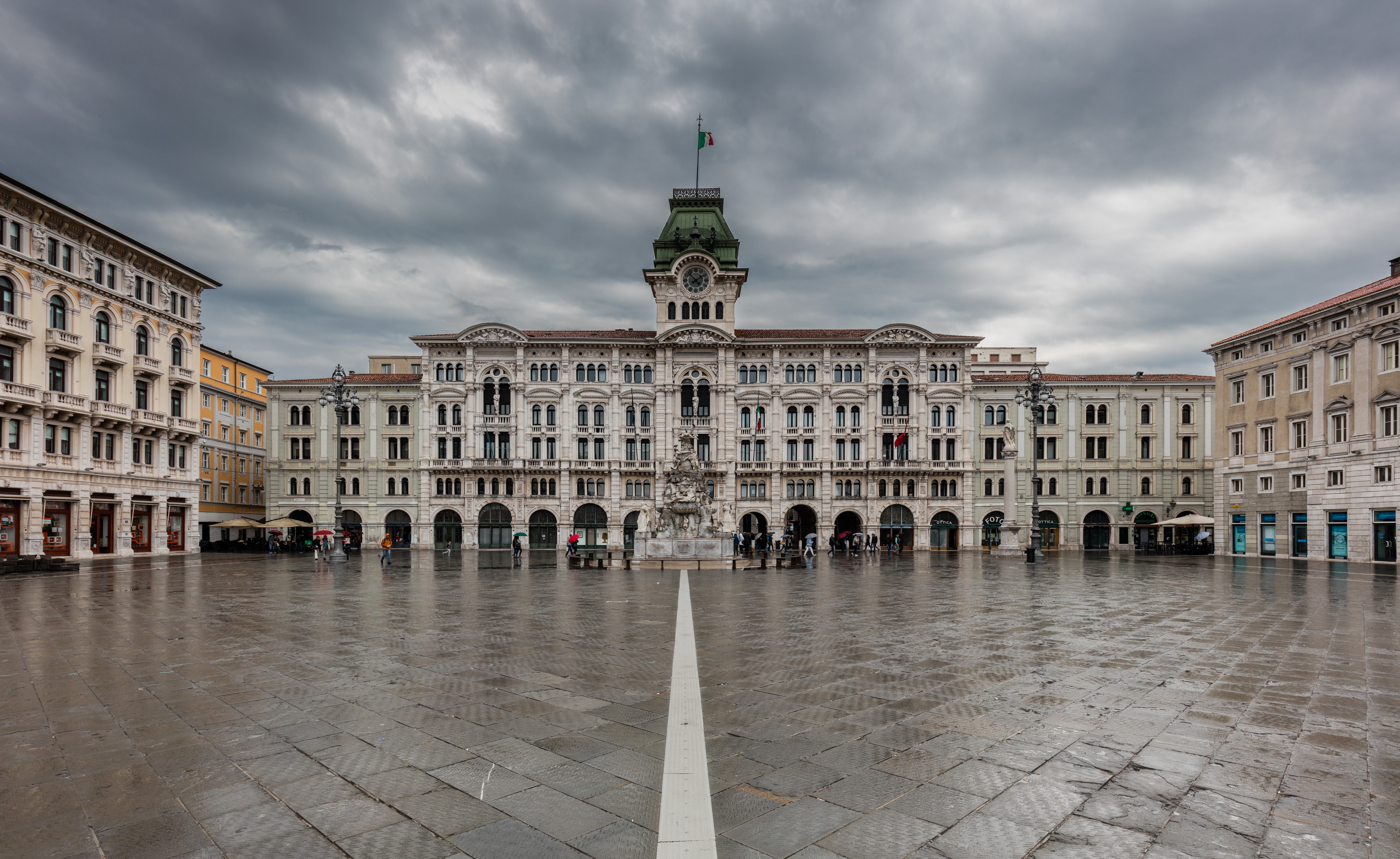
Trieste City Hall

Mayors of Trieste since 1949:

Mayor	Term start	Term end	Party
Gianni Bartoli	1949	1957	DC
Mario Franzil	1957	1967	DC
Marcello Spaccini	1967	1978	DC
Manlio Cecovini	1978	1983	LpT
Arduino Agnelli	1983	1985	PSI
Franco Richetti	1985	1986	DC
Giulio Staffieri	1986	1988	LpT
Franco Richetti	1988	1992	DC
Giulio Staffieri	1992	1993	LpT
Riccardo Illy	5 December 1993	24 June 2001	Ind
Roberto Dipiazza	24 June 2001	30 May 2011	FI
Roberto Cosolini	30 May 2011	20 June 2016	PD
Roberto Dipiazza	20 June 2016	incumbent	FI

=== Administrative divisions ===
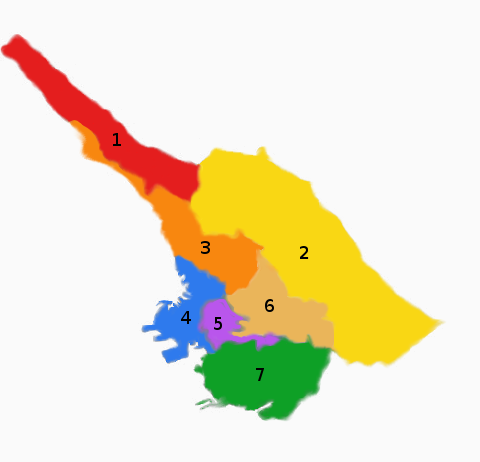
Seven sections of Trieste

Trieste is administratively divided into seven districts, which in turn are further subdivided into parishes (frazioni):

1. Altipiano Ovest: Borgo San Nazario · Contovello (Kontovel) · Prosecco (Prosek) · Santa Croce (Križ)
2. Altipiano Est: Banne (Bani) · Basovizza (Bazovica) · Gropada (Gropada) · Opicina (Opčine) · Padriciano (Padriče) · Trebiciano (Trebče)
3. Barcola (Slovene: Barkovlje) · Cologna (Slovene: Kolonja) · Conconello (Ferlugi) · Gretta (Slovene: Greta) · Grignano (Grljan) · Guardiella (Slovene: Verdelj) · Miramare · Roiano (Slovene: Rojan) · Scorcola (Škorklja)
4. Barriera Nuova · Borgo Giuseppino · Borgo Teresiano · Città Nuova · Città Vecchia · San Vito · San Giusto · Campi Elisi · Sant'Andrea · Cavana
5. Barriera Vecchia (Stara Mitnica) · San Giacomo (Sveti Jakob) · Santa Maria Maddalena Superiore (Sveta Marija Magdalena Zgornja)
6. Cattinara (Katinara) · Chiadino (Slovene: Kadinj) · San Luigi · Guardiella (Verdelj) · Longera (Slovene: Lonjer) · San Giovanni (Sveti Ivan)· Rozzol (Slovene: Rocol) · Melara
7. Chiarbola (Slovene: Čarbola) · Coloncovez (Kolonkovec) · Santa Maria Maddalena Inferiore (Slovene: Spodnja Sveta Marija Magdalena) · Raute · Santa Maria Maddalena Superiore (Slovene: Zgornja Sveta Marija Magdalena) · Servola (Škedenj) · Poggi Paese · Poggi Sant'Anna (Sveta Ana)· Valmaura · Altura · Borgo San Sergio

The iconic city centre is Piazza Unità d'Italia, which is located between the large 19th-century avenues of Borgo Teresiano and the old medieval city, characterised by many narrow streets.

== Main sights and vistas ==
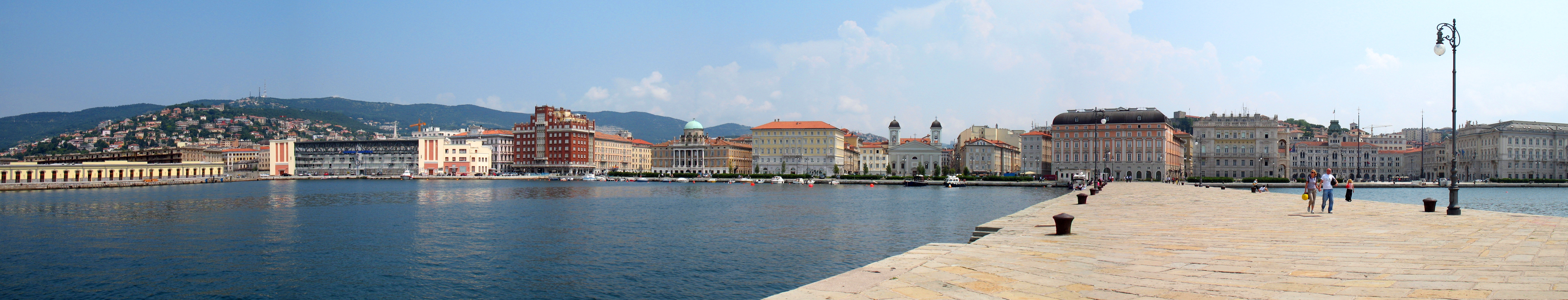
Trieste seafront

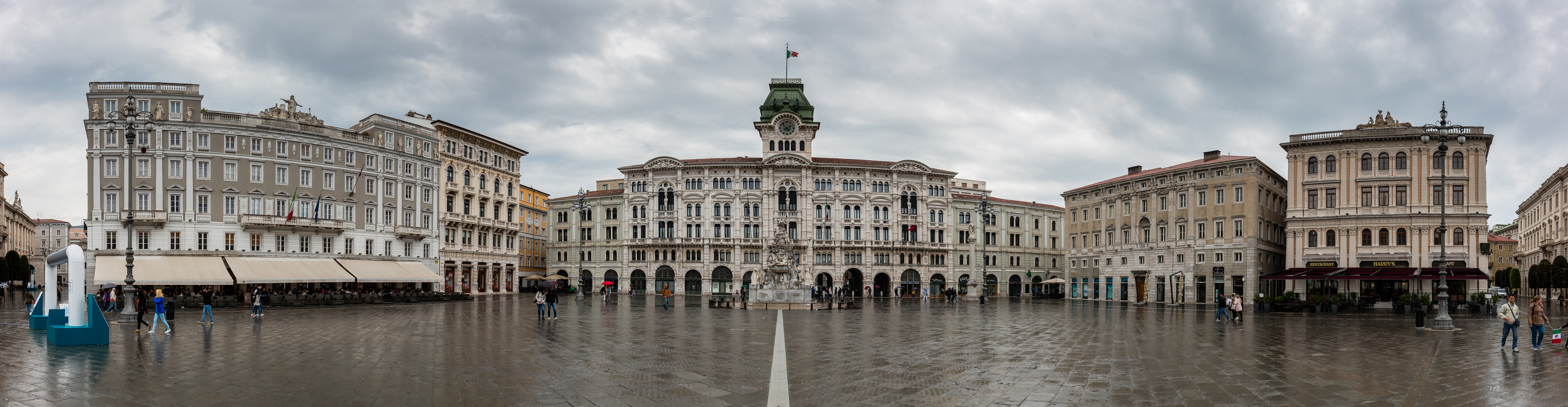
Piazza Unità d'Italia

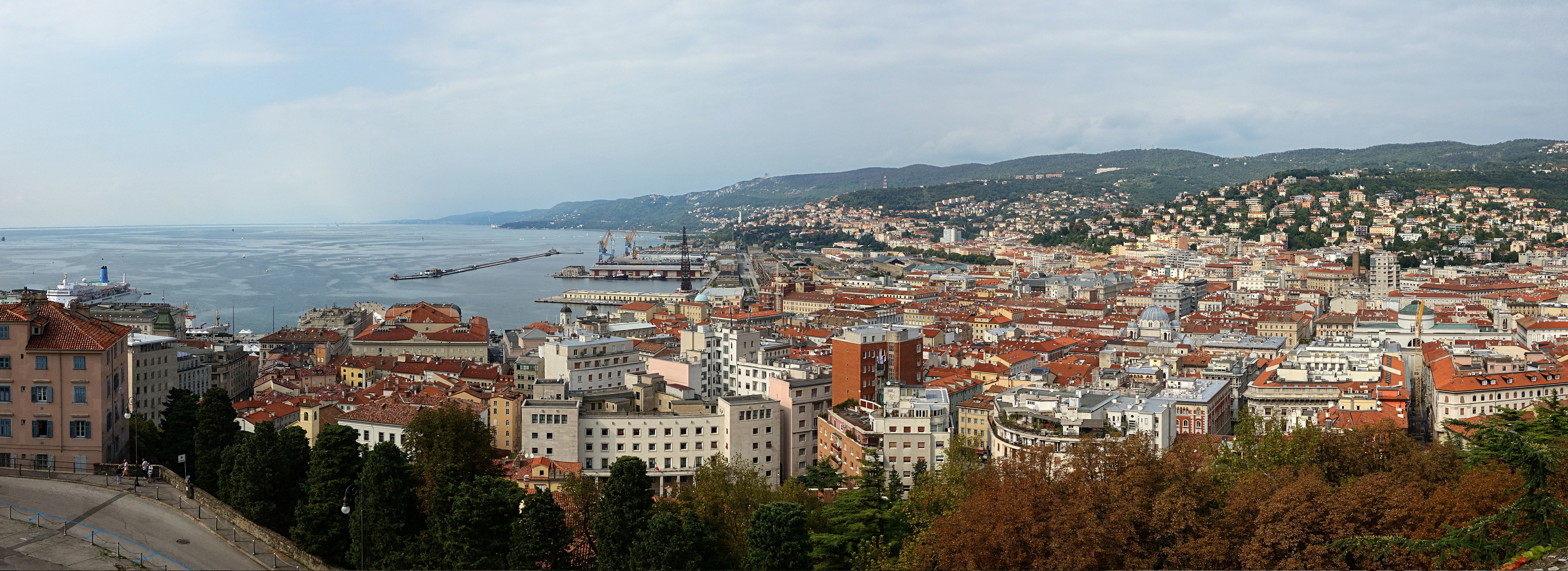
Trieste skyline from Trieste Cathedral

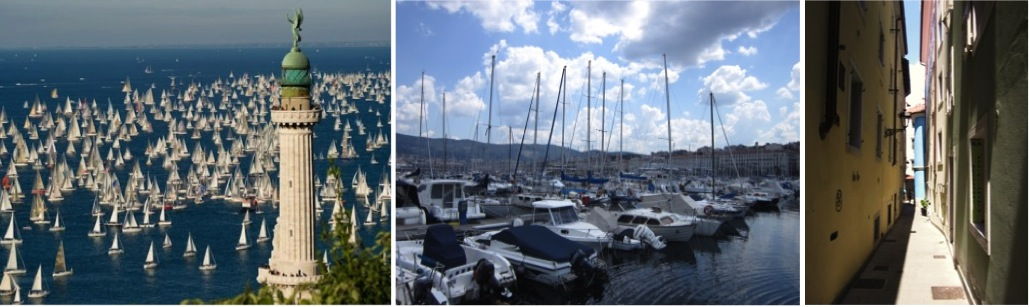
From left to right: Barcolana near the Victory Lighthouse; a part of the harbour; and a street of the Old City

In 2012, Lonely Planet listed Trieste as the world's most underrated travel destination.

=== Castles ===
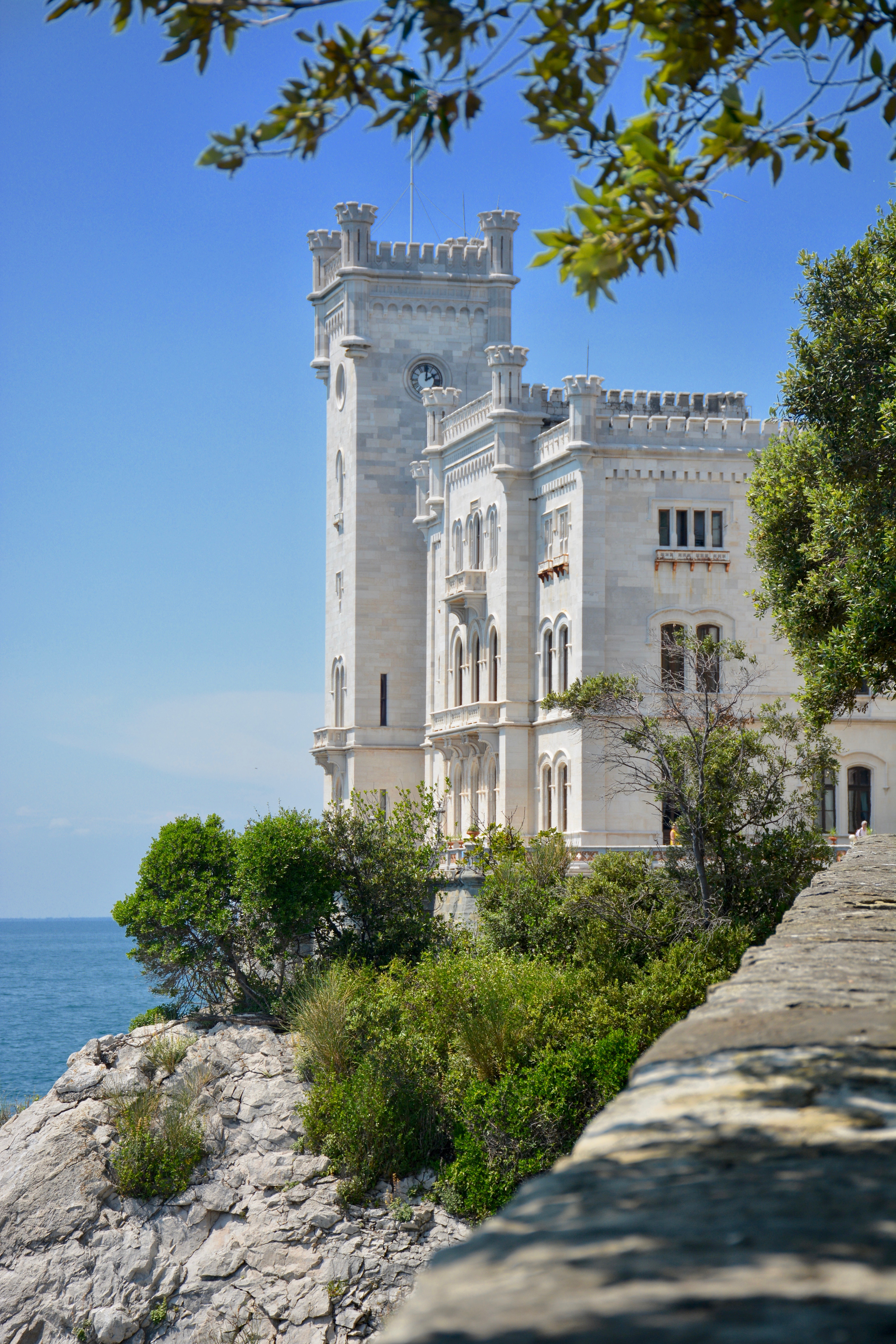
Miramare Castle

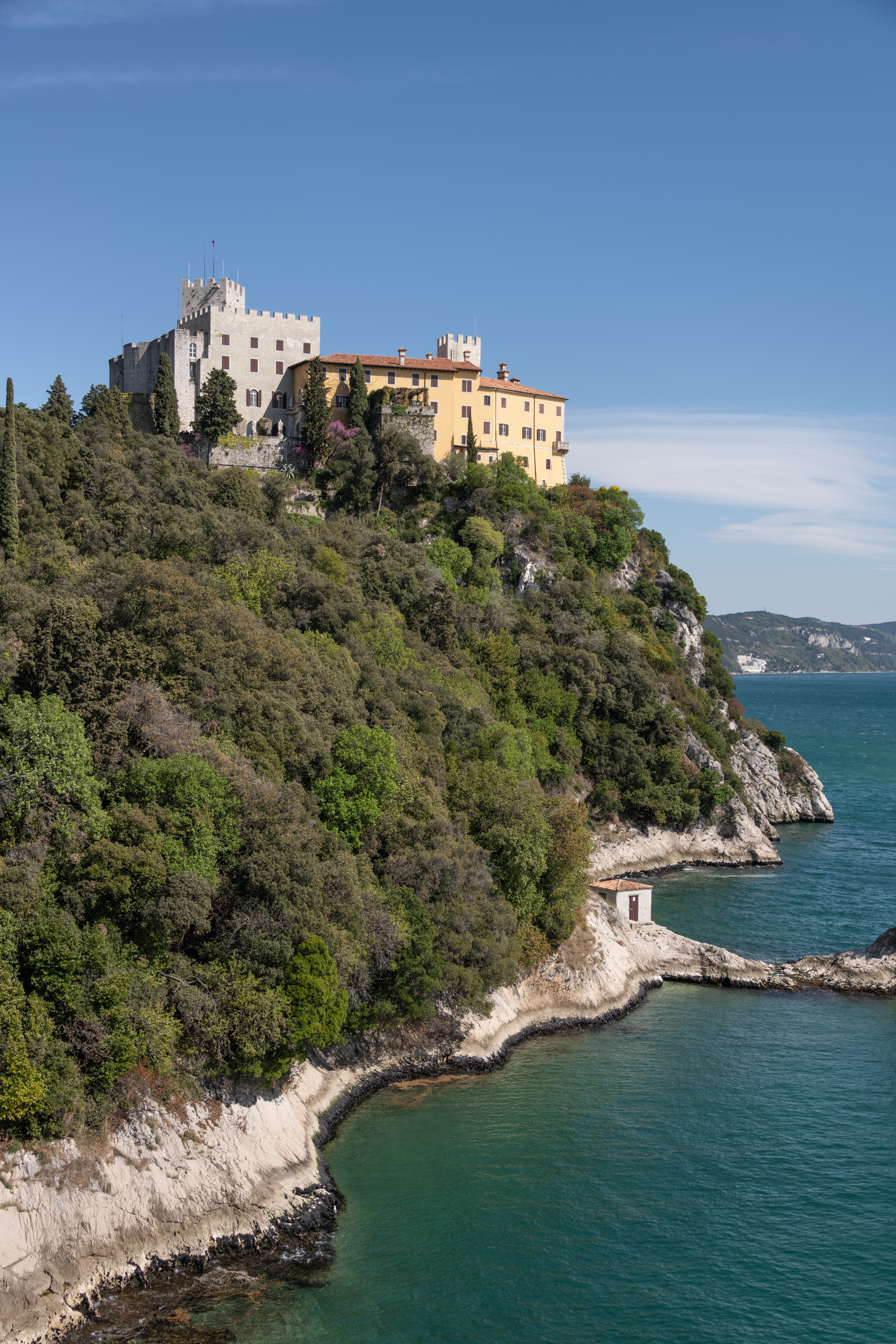
Castello di Duino

==== Castello Miramare (Miramare Castle) ====
The Castello Miramare, or Miramare Castle, on the waterfront 8 kilometres (5 miles) from Trieste, was built between 1856 and 1860 in a project by Carl Junker, commissioned by Archduke Maximilian. The castle gardens comprise a variety of trees, chosen by and planted on the orders of Maximilian. Features of the gardens include two ponds, one noted for its swans and the other for lotus flowers, the castle dependence ("Castelletto"), a bronze statue of Maximilian, and a small chapel where a cross made from the remains of the "Novara" is kept, the flagship on which Maximilian, brother of Emperor Franz Josef, set sail to become Emperor of Mexico.

During the 1930s, the castle was also the home of Prince Amedeo, Duke of Aosta, the last commander of Italian forces in East Africa during the Second World War. During the period of the application of the Instrument for the Provisional Regime of the Free Territory of Trieste, as established in the Treaty of Peace with Italy (Paris 10/02/1947), the castle served as headquarters for the United States Army's TRUST force.

==== Castello di Duino ====
Castello di Duino (English: Duino Castle) is a 14th-century castle overlooking the Gulf of Trieste in the municipality of Duino-Aurisina, Friuli Venezia Giulia, Italy. Built on the ruins of an earlier medieval fortress, it has been the residence of the House of Thurn und Taxis since 1879. The castle is known for its cliff-top location, historic interiors, and gardens. The castle is closely associated with the Austrian poet Rainer Maria Rilke, who began writing his Duino Elegies there in 1912 while staying as a guest of Princess Marie von Thurn und Taxis. Today, Castello di Duino is open to the public and is one of the region's most popular historic attractions.

=== Places of worship ===
- St Justus Cathedral (1320). Named after the city's Patron, Justus of Trieste, the church's interiors are decorated with Byzantine mosaics. It became a symbol of Italian Trieste during the Risorgimento.
- Sant'Antonio Taumaturgo (1842)
- Temple of Monte Grisa (1960), a Roman Catholic church north of the city
- Most Holy Trinity of Cattinara: built in 1783 and erected as parish in 1892.
- Saint Spyridon Serbian Orthodox Church (1869). The building adopts the Greek-cross plan with five cupolas in the Byzantine tradition. The parish forms part of the Serbian Orthodox Eparchy of Austria and Switzerland.
- Greek Orthodox Church of San Nicolò dei Greci (1787). This church by the architect Matteo Pertsch (1818), with bell towers on both sides of the façade, follows the Austrian late baroque style. The interiors are decorated by golden ornaments.
- Synagogue of Trieste (1912)
- Church of Saints John and Paul (1467)
- Santa Maria Maggiore (1682)
- The Anglican Chiesa di Cristo (Christ Church) (1829)
- The Mekhitarist Armenian Catholic Church (1859)
- The Waldensian and Helvetian Evangelical Basilica of St. Silvester (11th century)
- The Church of Santa Maria Maggiore (1682)
- The Augustan Evangelical-Lutheran Church (1874)

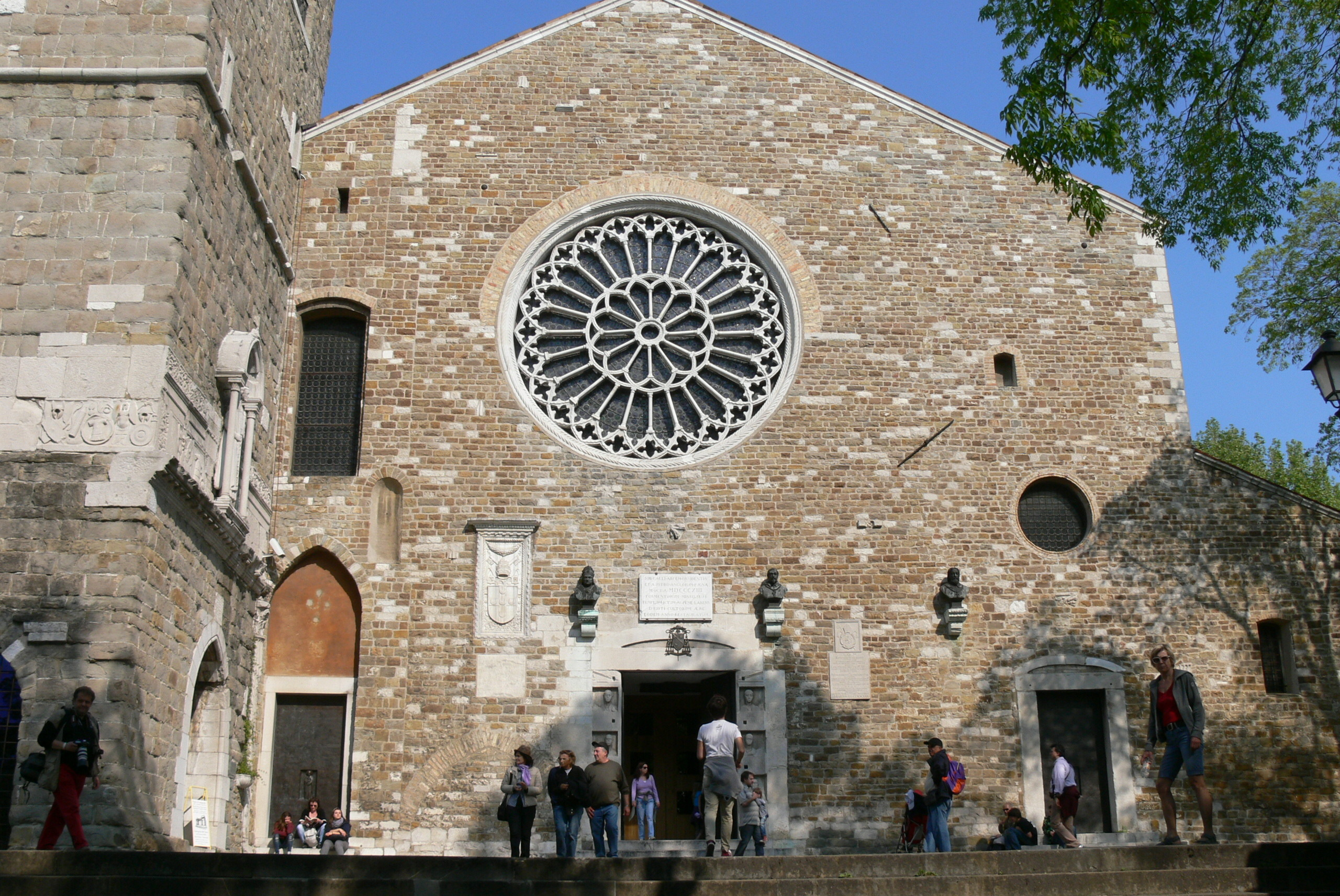
Trieste Cathedral

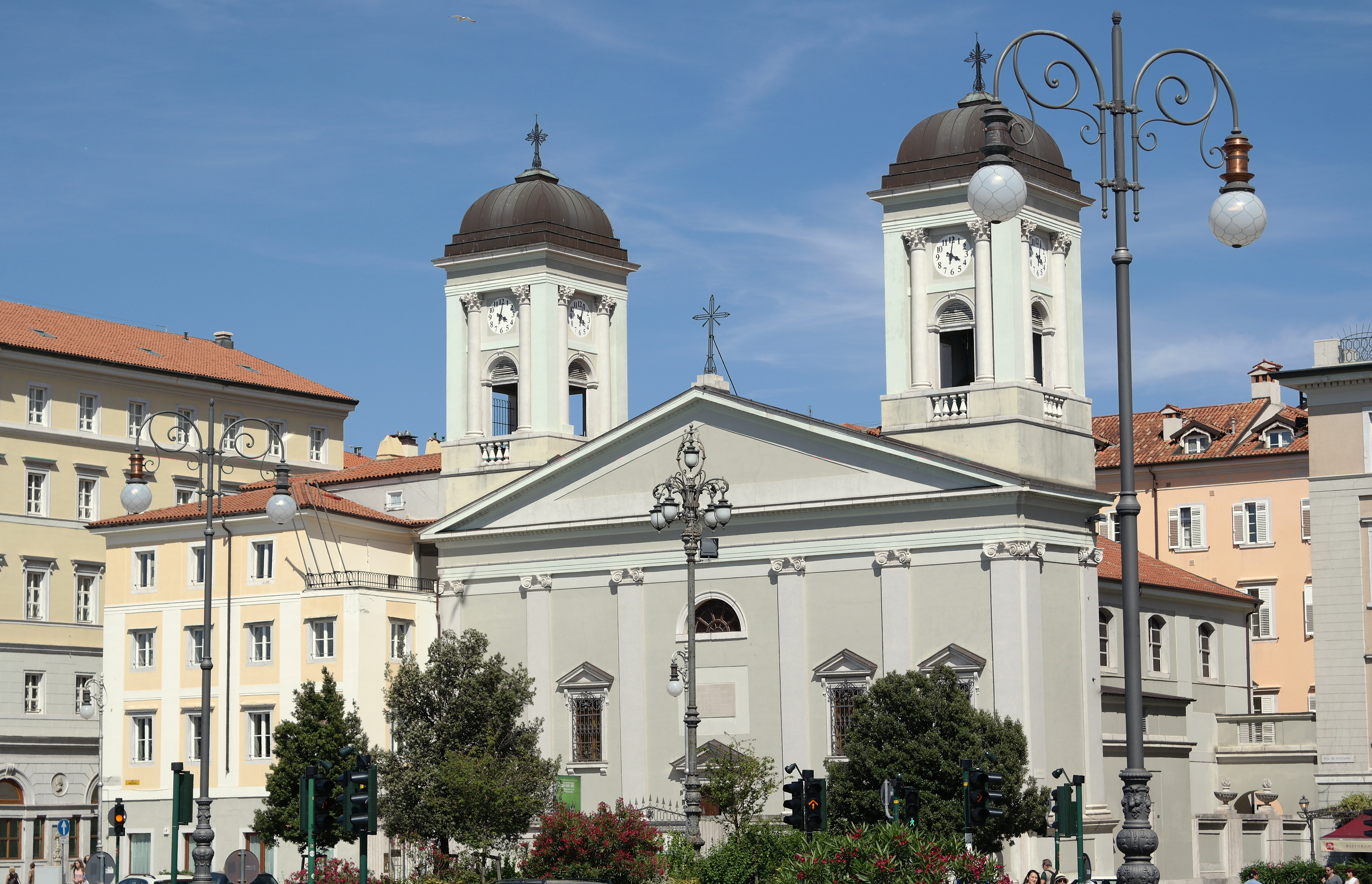
Greek Orthodox Church of San Nicolò dei Greci

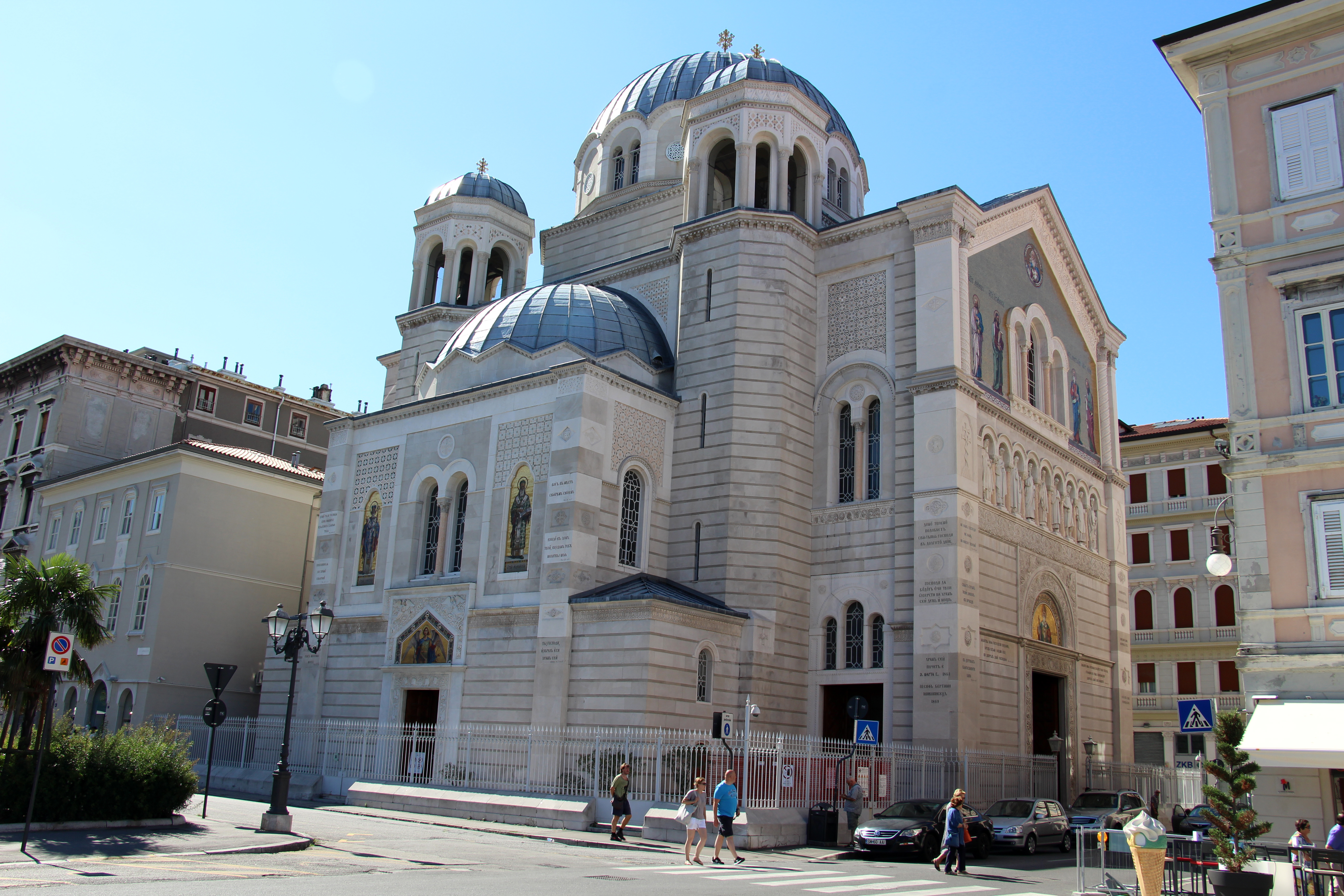
Saint Spyridon Serbian Orthodox Church

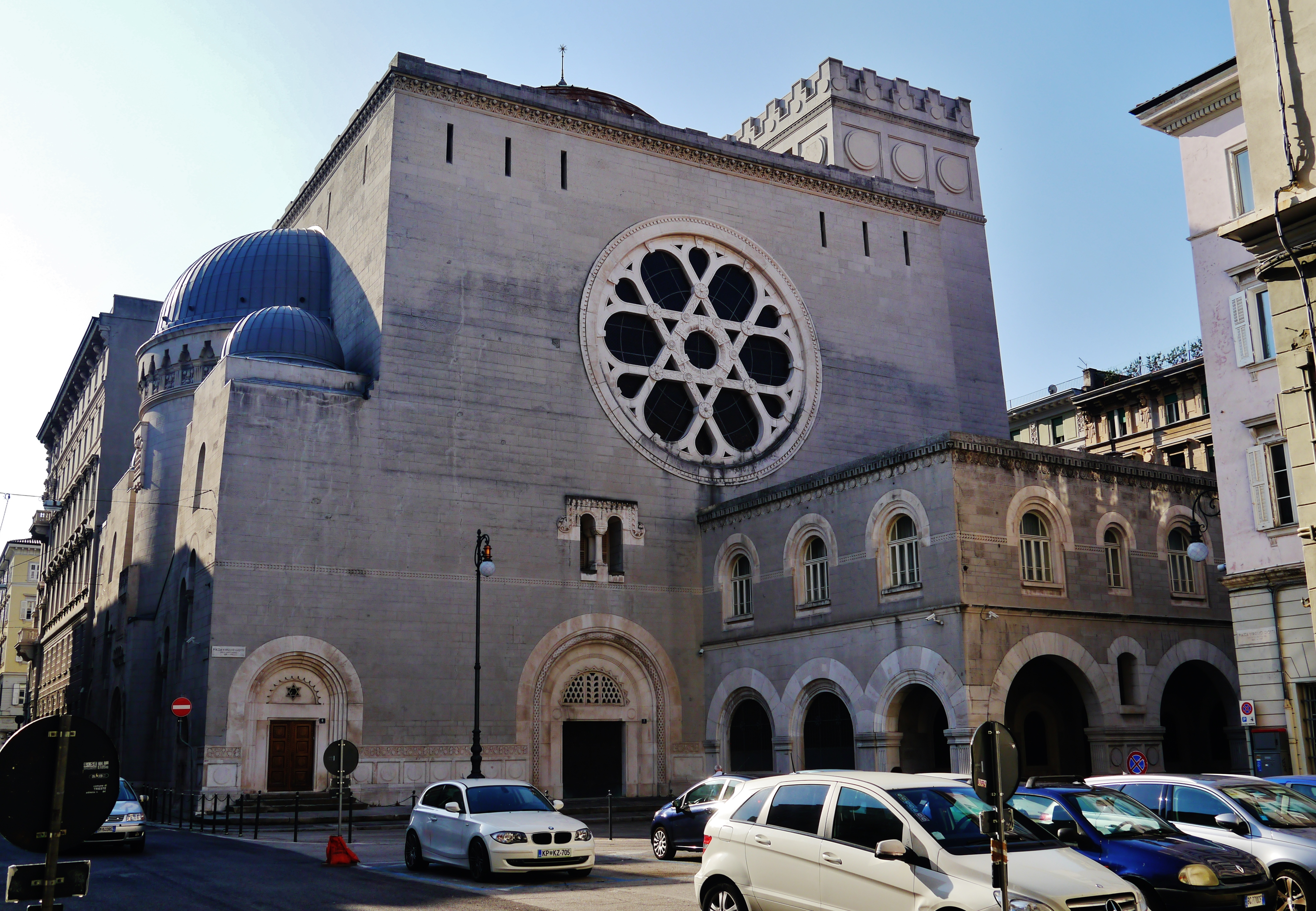
Synagogue of Trieste

=== Archaeological remains ===
- Arco di Riccardo (33 BC) is a gate built in the Roman walls in 33 BC. It stands in Piazzetta Barbacan, in the narrow streets of the old town. Its current name is believed to be a corruption of Arco del Cardo, referring to the cardo, the main north-to-south Roman street; folk etymology credits it to Richard the Lionheart (Italian: Riccardo Cuor di Leone), a Crusader king of England.
- Basilica Forense (2nd century)
- Palaeochristian basilica (4th to 6th century)
- Roman Age Temples: one dedicated to Athena, one to Zeus, both on the San Giusto hill.

The ruins of the temple dedicated to Zeus are next to the Forum, those of Athena's temple are under the basilica, visitors can see its basement.

=== Roman theatre ===
Roman Amphitheater in Trieste

The Roman theatre lies at the foot of the San Giusto hill, facing the sea. The construction partially exploits the gentle slope of the hill, and much of the theatre is made of stone. The topmost portion of the steps and the stage were supposedly made of wood. The statues which adorned the theatre, brought to light in the 1930s, are now preserved in the town museum. Three inscriptions from the Trajanic period mention a certain Q. Petronius Modestus, someone closely connected to the development of the theatre, which was erected during the second half of the 1st century. This amphitheatre held tragedies, comedies, and gladiator fights. It was hidden for quite some time and was excavated in 1937–1938.

=== Caves ===
In the entire Province of Trieste, there are 10 speleological groups out of 24 in the whole Friuli-Venezia Giulia region. The Trieste plateau (Altopiano Triestino), called Kras or the Carso and covering an area of about 200 square kilometres (77 mi^{2}) within Italy has approximately 1,500 caves of various sizes (like that of Basovizza, now a monument to the Foibe massacres).

Among the more famous are the Grotta Gigante, the largest tourist cave in the world, with a single cavity large enough to contain St Peter's in Rome, and the Cave of Trebiciano, 350 metres (1,150 ft) deep, at the bottom of which flows the Timavo River. This river dives underground at the Škocjan Caves in Slovenia (on the UNESCO list and only a few kilometres from Trieste) and flows about 30 kilometres (19 mi) before emerging about 1 kilometre (0.6 mi) from the sea in a series of springs near Duino, reputed by the Romans to be an entrance to Hades ("the world of the dead").

=== Piazzas ===
- Piazza Unità d'Italia, Trieste's central majestic square surrounded by 19th century architecture, and the largest seafront square in Europe. The cruise ship terminal Trieste Terminal Passeggeri (TTP) is next to the Piazza Unità d'Italia.

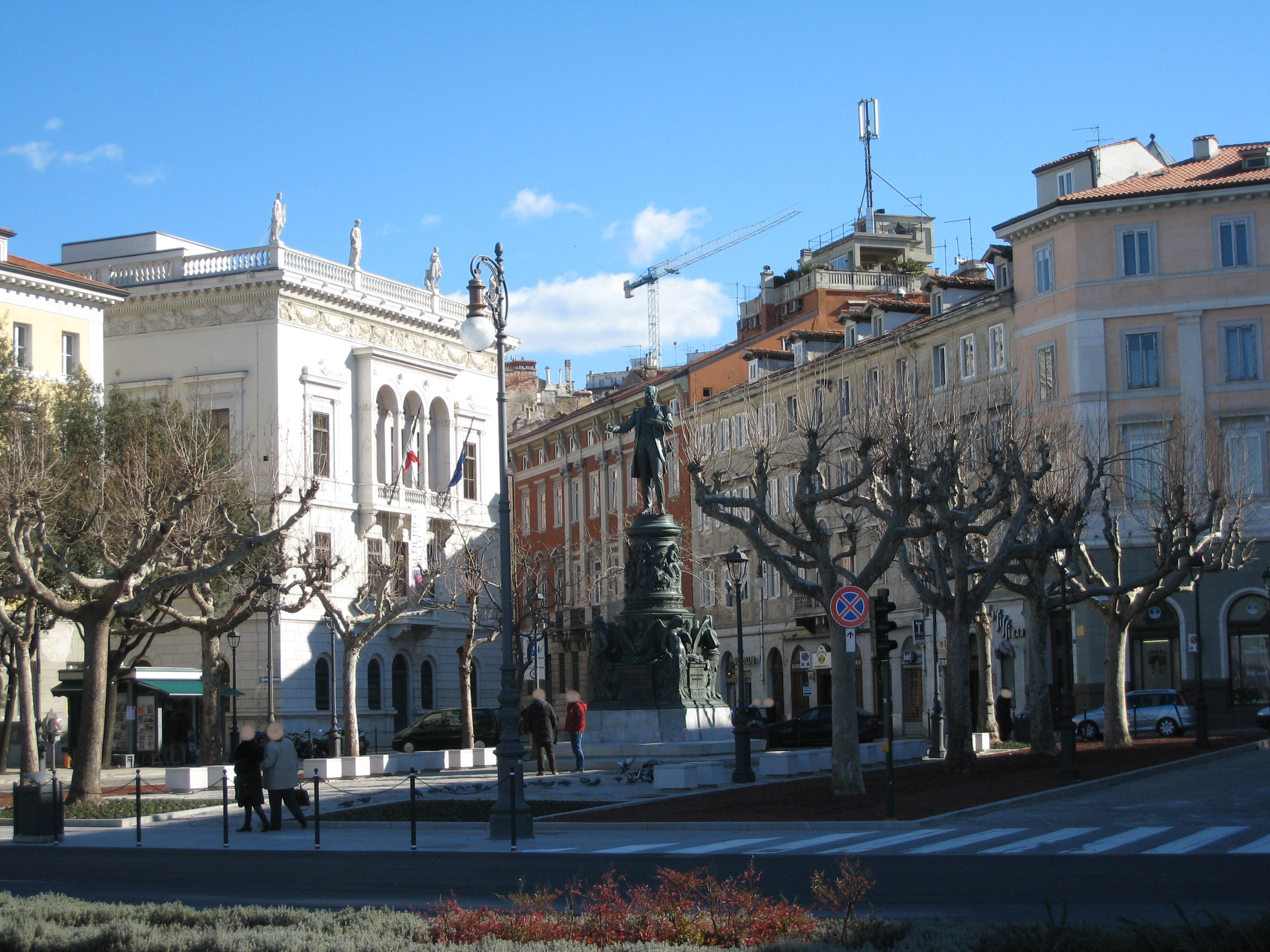
Piazza Venezia

- Piazza Venezia, with a view over the Adriatic. Since 2009, the monument to Archduke Maximilian has been located in Piazza Venezia again, looking over the Gulf of Trieste to the Miramare Castle, the subject wearing a Vice Admiral's uniform. The more than 8 metre high bronze monument, with the allegories of the four continents, is intended to honour Maximilian's philanthropy and his interest in science and art. It was sculpted by sculptor Johannes Schilling at the request of and under the direction of Baron Pasquale Revoltella. It was inaugurated in 1875 in the presence of Emperor Franz Joseph, later removed after 1918 and relocated to the Miramare Castle Park in 1961. Museo Revoltella is located in Piazza Venezia in the style of the Italian Renaissance with its six allegorical statues of the Venetian Francesco Bosa on the roof balustrade.

=== Architecture ===
- The Austrian Quarter: Half of the city was built during the Austro-Hungarian period, giving the city some aspects of Vienna's architectural characteristics. The majority of buildings were built in Neoclassical, Art Nouveau, Eclectic and Liberty styles.
- Città Vecchia (Old City): Trieste has an extensive old city: there are many narrow and crooked streets with typical medieval houses. Almost all of the area is closed to traffic.
- The Stazione Rogers (gas station "Aquila" designed by Ernesto Nathan Rogers) is considered an important building of Italian rationalism and post-war modernism and is now a multi-purpose centre for culture and architecture.
- Molo Sartorio, where still today the sea level for the Republic of Austria, a landlocked nation, is measured as "metres above the Adriatic". The historic "Antico Magazzino Vini" next to the Piazza Venezia was built in 1902 to store wine from Dalmatia and Istria. It has now been revitalised and now houses an Eataly. The former fish market, now renovated, is now a place for exhibitions and art, and is also located directly by the sea.
- Canal Grande, Trieste's grand canal, in the very centre of the city.
- Barcola, a suburb of Trieste with a special microclimate and a high quality of life since ancient times. On its kilometre-long sea promenade towards Miramare Castle there are cafes and restaurants. Many locals spend their free time on this urban beach area, sunbathing, swimming and playing sports.The northernmost lighthouse in the Mediterranean, the Vittoria Light, located above Barcola, dominates the skyline above.

=== Nature reserve ===
- Rosandra Valley, part of a national park on the border between the Province of Trieste and Slovenia. The 40-metre (130 ft) Supet Falls attract attention.

=== Beaches ===
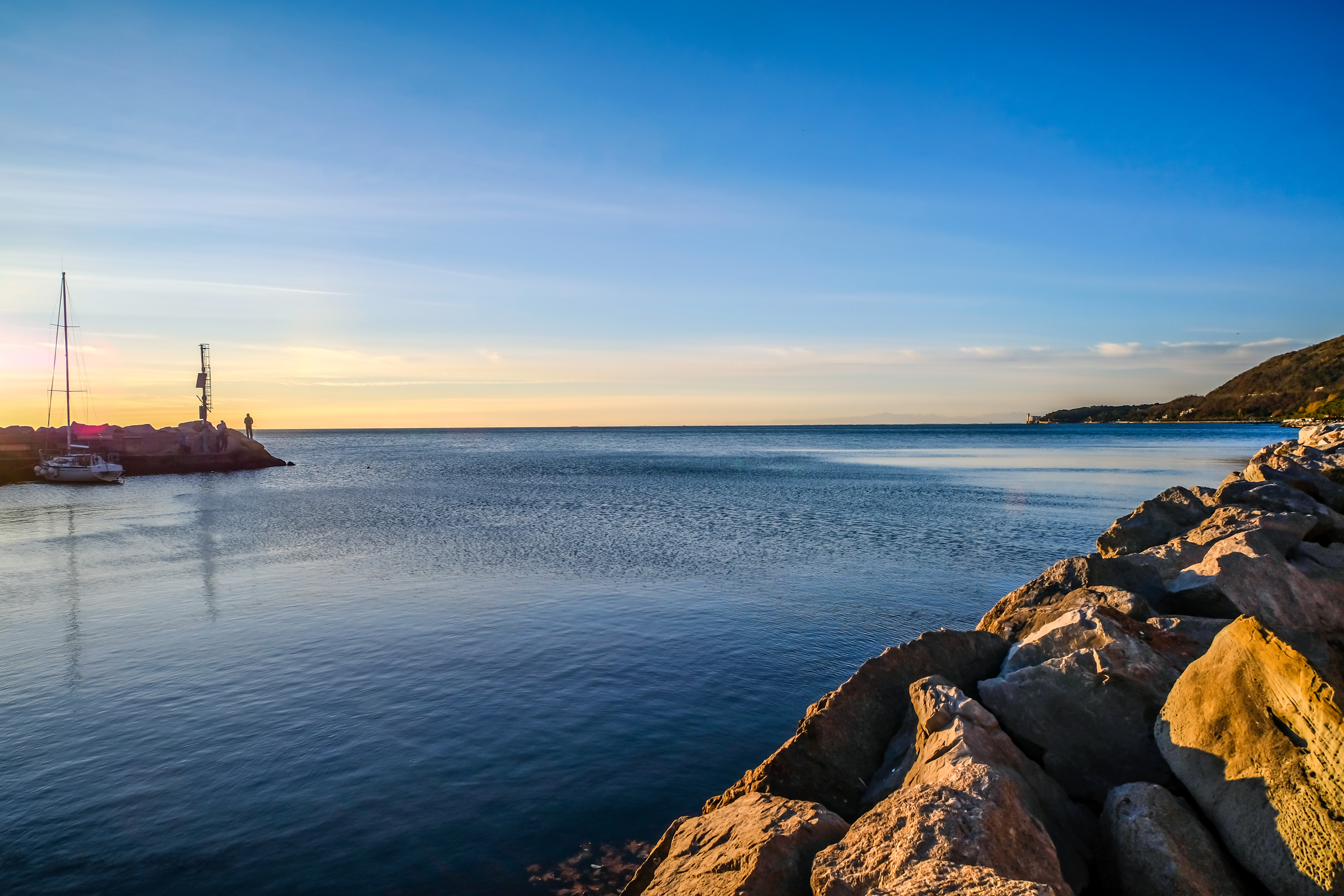
View of Barcola

Much of Trieste lies directly on the sea. Some bathing establishments are located in the very centre, like the "El Pedocin - Bagno marino La Lanterna" and the "Ausonia". The "Bagno Marino Ferroviario" has been located in Viale Miramare 30 since 1925. Many locals and students use their lunch break or free time to go to Barcola, which is an urban beach, to meet friends on the famous mile-long embankment. In the evening, many locals walk there between the bars with a view of the sea, the Alpine arc, Istria and the city. "Alla Lanterna" beach in a corner of the harbour, opened in 1903, remains a sex-segregated beach, reportedly the last in Europe.

Well-known are the 10 popular semi-circular units on the bank consisting of a viewing platform, sanitary facilities and changing rooms, which are popularly referred to as "Topolini". In the area of the Excelsior bathing establishment, which is located on a historic sand bank, there were elegant Roman villas and their sports and bathing facilities in antiquity. Already in the 19th century there were numerous restaurants and cafes with shady vine arbors. The sea around Miramare Castle is today a nature reserve.

The pine forest of Barcola is located directly on the sea and is a meeting place for the inhabitants in every season. One of the best running routes in Trieste leads from Barcola to Miramare Castle and back. The small bathing complex Bagno da Sticco is right next to Miramare Castle. Further towards Grignano and Duino there are numerous bays and natural beaches. Due to the currents in the Adriatic, the water in the area of Trieste is very pure and not polluted by suspended matter from rivers. The current is counterclockwise.

== Culture ==
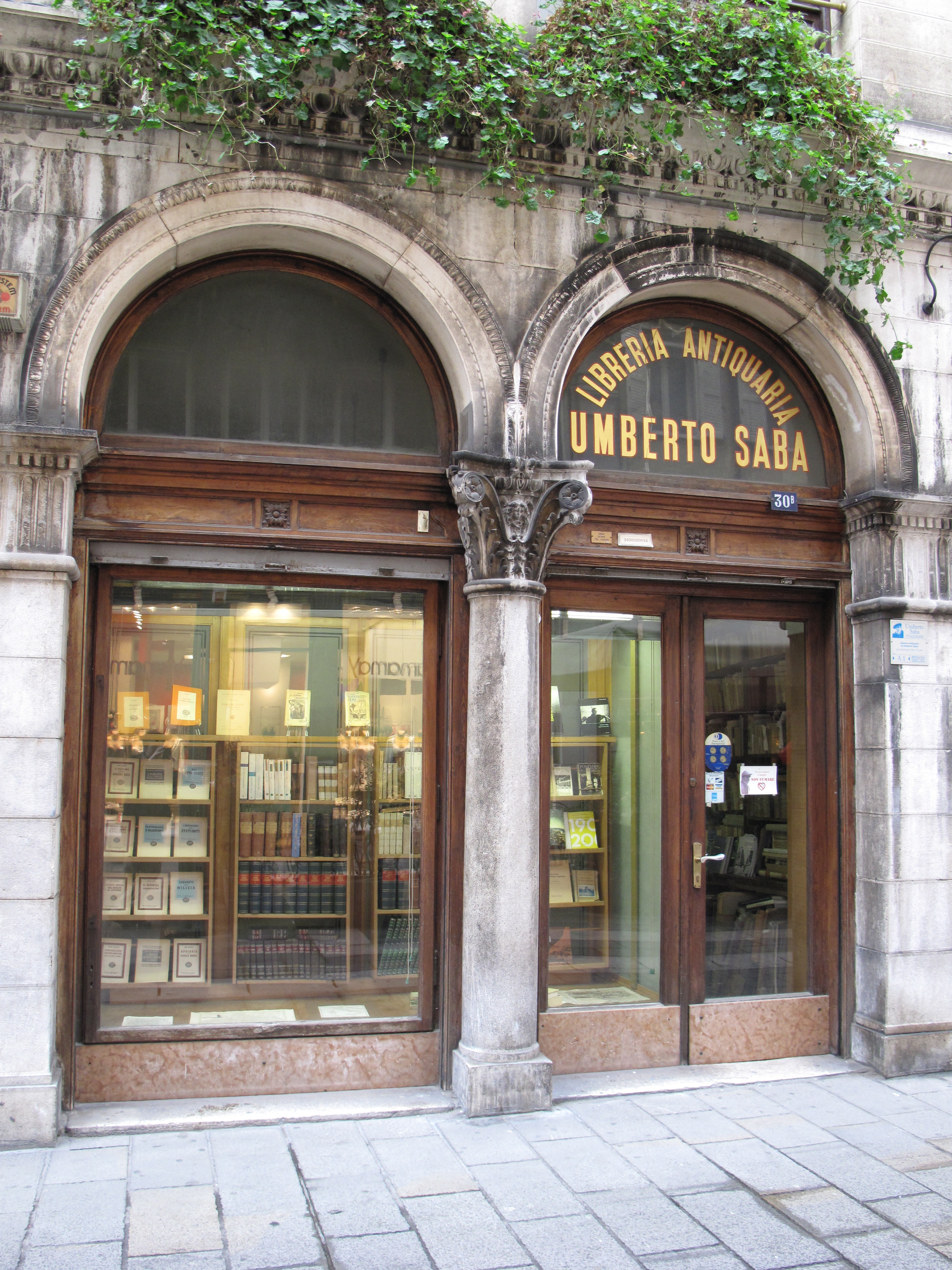
Libreria Antiquaria Umberto Saba

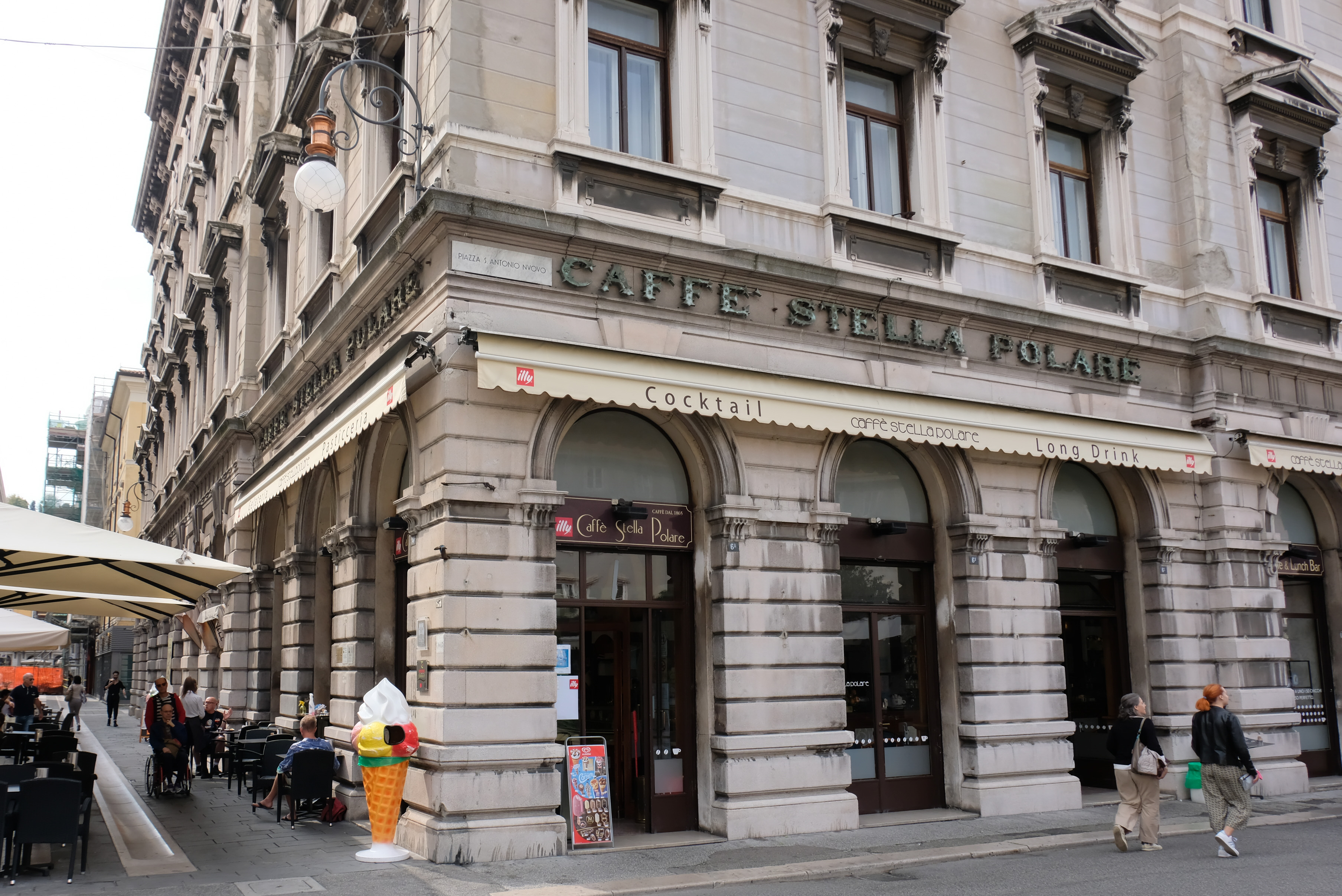
James Joyce, Umberto Saba and their friends were guests of the still-existing Caffè Stella Polare.

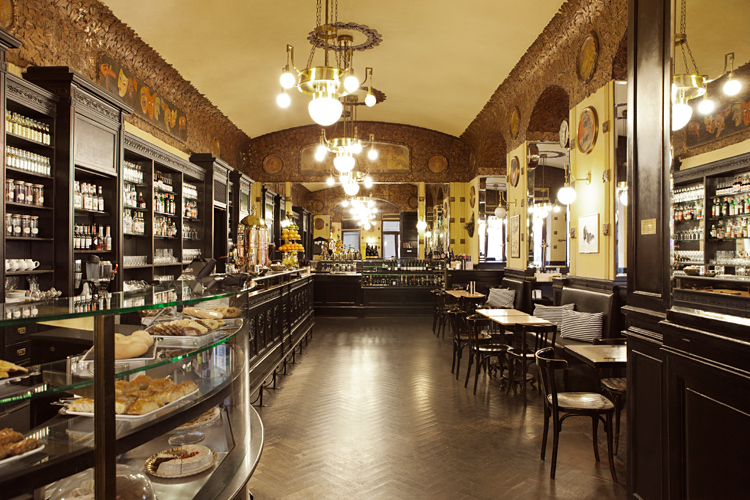
Caffè San Marco

The literary-intellectual centre of Trieste is mostly located in the downtown area: "Libreria Antiquaria Umberto Saba" located at the ground floor of Via San Nicolò No. 30, where James Joyce lived (where his son Giorgio was born and where Joyce wrote some of the short stories from Dubliners and Stephen Hero); the house in Via San Nicolò No. 31, where Umberto Saba spent his breaks at the cafe-milk shop "Walter" and the house in Via San Nicolò No. 32, in which the Berlitz School was located and where James Joyce came into contact with and subsequently taught Italo Svevo, are all of literary relevance. Around this area, at the end of Via San Nicolò, a life-size statue of Umberto Saba has been placed by the city government. Having Via San Nicolò become Trieste's high street, numerous cafes and restaurants that used to be located there, most notably the Berger beer hall at No. 17, which later became the Berger Grand Restaurant, have now ceased operations. Via San Nicolò No. 30 is also the symbolic centre of the homonymous novel by Roberto Curci. One of the most important Art Nouveau buildings in Trieste, the "Casa Smolars", completed in 1905, stands in Via San Nicolò No. 36. Eppinger Caffè has been located nearby since around 1946. The former "Palazzo della RAS", located in Piazza della Repubblica, has been completely renovated and is now an hotel.

Caffe Stella Polare is located in Piazza Ponterosso. This cosmopolitan coffee house was also frequented by Saba, Joyce, Guido Voghera, Virgilio Giotti and in particular by the former German-speaking minority from Trieste. With the end of World War II and the arrival of the Anglo-Americans in the city, this café became a hangout place of many soldiers and a famous ballroom to meet local young women. Trieste hosts the annual ITS (International Talent Support Awards) young fashion designer competition. The power metal band Rhapsody was founded in Trieste by the city's natives Luca Turilli and Alex Staropoli.

Harry's Piccolo is the only Michelin-starred restaurant in Trieste. Next to Piazza Unita d'Italia the streets of the Cavana district are lined with design-led cafes and delis.

Caffè San Marco, a historical coffee house in the centre of the city. Cafès play an important role in the Triestine economy, as Trieste developed a thriving coffee industry under the influence of Austria-Hungary nobility, and is still known to this day as "the coffee capital of Italy".

=== Film ===
Trieste has been portrayed on screen a number of times, with films often shot on location including the 2025 film Heads of State. In 1942 the early neorealist Alfa Tau! was filmed partly in the city.

Cinematic interest in Trieste peaked during the height of the "Free Territory" era from 1947 to 1954, with international films such as Sleeping Car to Trieste and Diplomatic Courier portraying it as a hotbed of espionage. These films, along with The Yellow Rolls-Royce (1964), conveyed an image of the city as a cosmopolitan place of conflict between Great Powers, a portrayal which resembles Casablanca (1943). Italian filmmakers, by contrast, portrayed Trieste as unquestionably Italian in a series of patriotic films, including Trieste mia! and Ombre su Trieste.

In 1963, the city hosted the first International Festival of Science Fiction Film (Festival internazionale del film di fantascienza), which ran until 1982. Under the name Science Plus Fiction (now Trieste Science+Fiction Festival), the festival was revived in 2000.

An interest in the city has been sparked by movies such as The Invisible Boy (2014), its sequel The Invisible Boy—Second Generation, and the TV series La Porta Rossa.

=== Theaters and museums ===
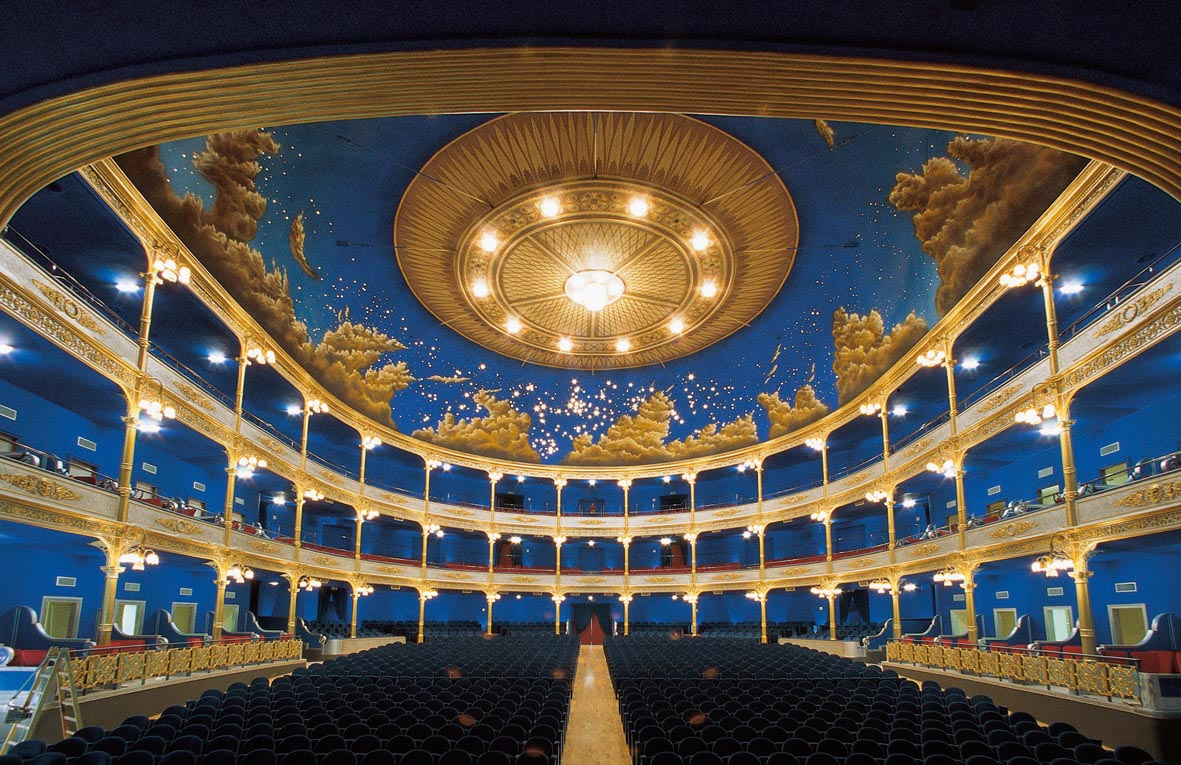
Politeama Rossetti

Trieste has a lively cultural scene with various theaters. Among these figure Teatro Lirico Giuseppe Verdi, Politeama Rossetti, the Teatro La Contrada, the Slovene theatre in Trieste (Slovensko stalno gledališče, since 1902), Teatro Miela, and several smaller ones.

There are also a number of museums. Among these are:

- Diego de Henriquez war museum
- Museo Sartorio
- Revoltella Museum modern art gallery
- Jewish Museum Carlo e Vera Wagner
- Museo Civico di Storia Naturale di Trieste (natural history museum) containing fossils of Hominids.

=== Botanical gardens ===
- Civico Orto Botanico di Trieste, the municipal botanical garden
- Orto Botanico dell'Università di Trieste, the University of Trieste's botanical garden

=== National monuments ===
Two important national monuments:

- The Risiera di San Sabba (Risiera di San Sabba Museum), a national monument commemorating the Holocaust. It was the only Nazi concentration camp with a crematorium in Italy.
- The Foiba di Basovizza, a National monument. It is a reminder of the killings of Italians by Yugoslav partisans after World War II.

The Slovenska gospodarsko-kulturna zveza—Unione Economica-Culturale Slovena is the umbrella organisation bringing together cultural and economic associations belonging to the Slovene minority.

=== Cuisine ===
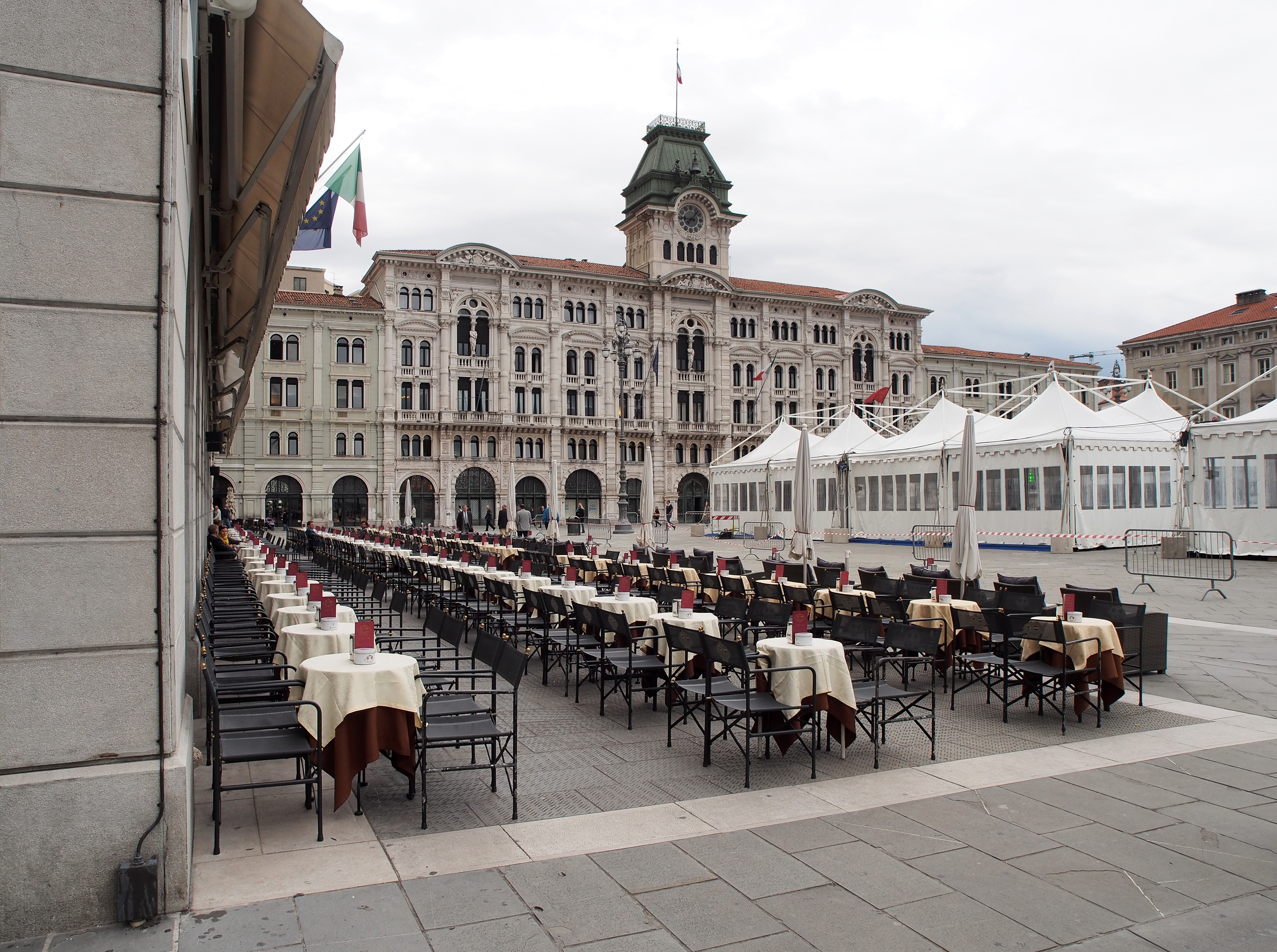
Caffe degli Specchi was opened in 1839 in Trieste

Long established authentic restaurants include Buffet da Pepi, Vecio Buffet Marascutti, Buffet Siora Rosa, and Antica Trattoria Suban. Buffet means that restaurant staff assemble a platter of cold cuts and antipasto for the customer who chooses either a lunch meal or a snack. Local cuisine has been influenced by the various ethnic groups which have populated the city, mainly Central Europeans. Traditional main courses include jota, minestra de bisi spacai (pea stew), rotolo di spinaci in straza (spinach rolls), sardoni impanai (breaded anchovies, a sought-after delicacy), capuzi garbi (krauts), capuzi garbi in tecia (sautéed krauts), vienna sausages, goulash, ćevapi and frito misto (fried fish). Popular desserts are presnitz, fave triestine, titola, crostoli, struccolo de pomi, kugelhupf, rigo jancsi and the Triester torte.

Capo Triestino (also capo in B or capo in bicchiere) is considered a local coffee speciality. This miniature cappuccino in a glass cup is usually consumed at the bar. The Prosecco wine is served in hundreds of variations. The eponymous village of Prosecco is located within the limits of the Trieste municipality.

== Economy ==
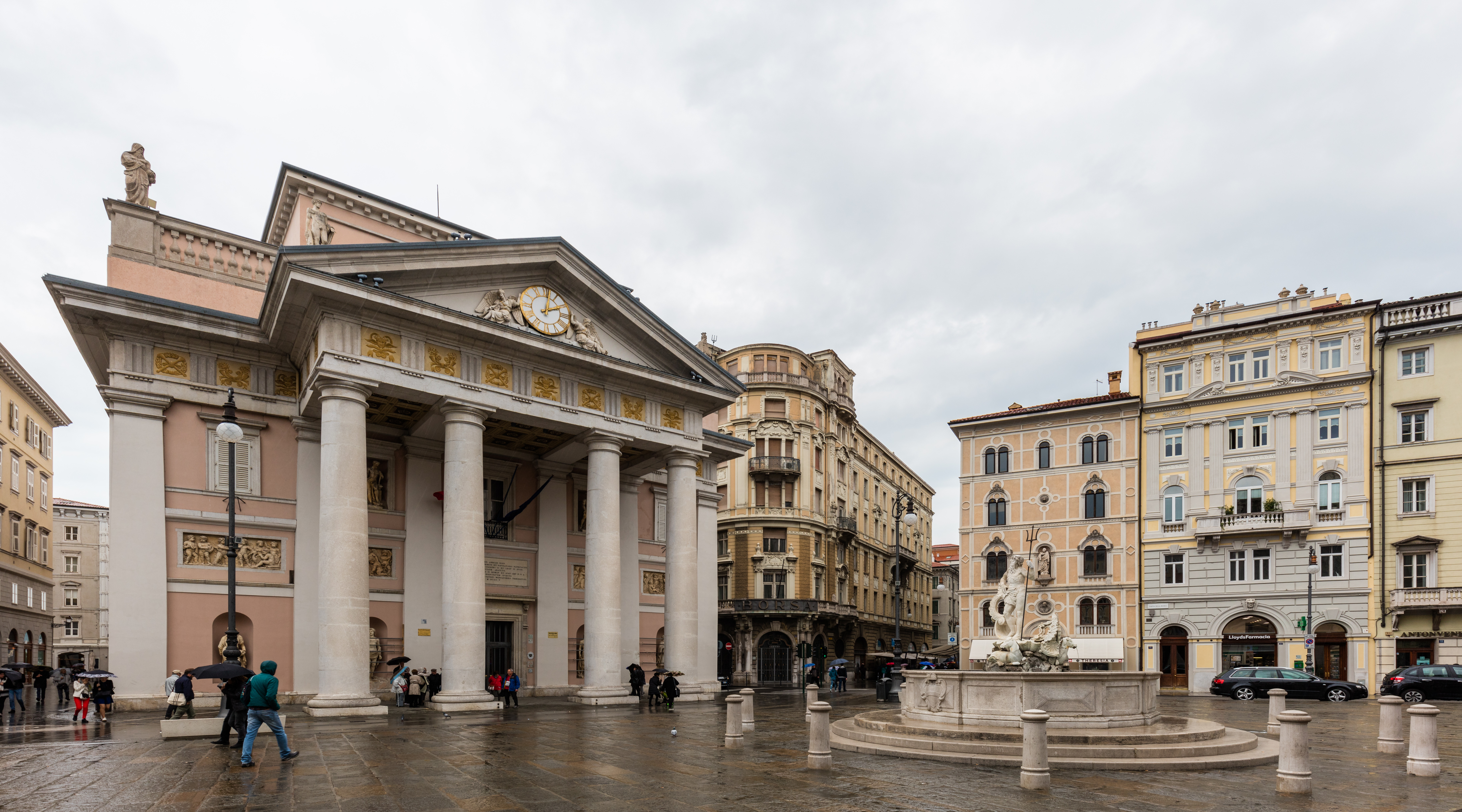
Trieste Commodity Exchange

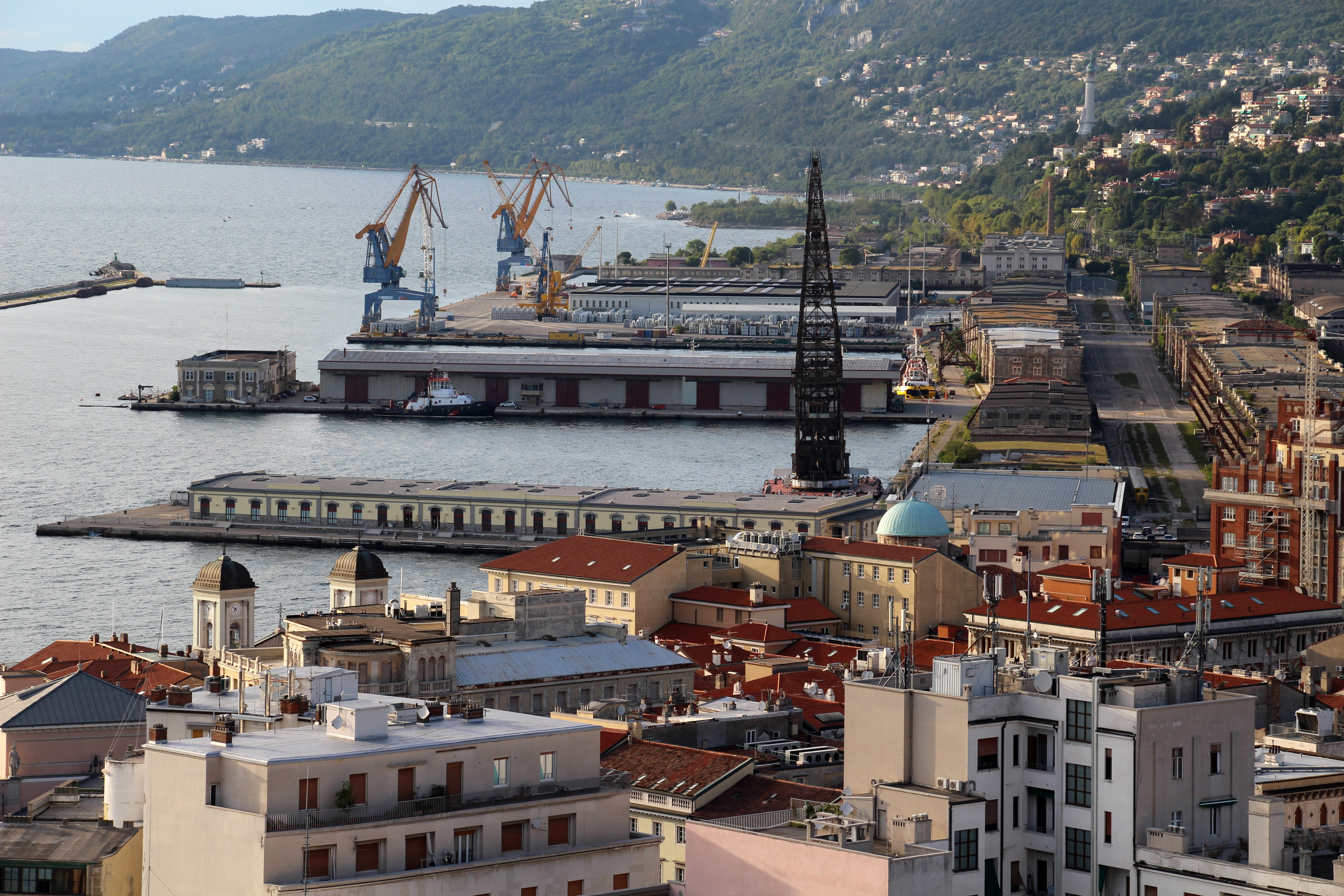
Port of Trieste

During the Austro-Hungarian era, Trieste became a leading European city in economy, trade and commerce, and was the fourth-largest and most important centre in the empire, after Vienna, Budapest and Prague. The economy of Trieste, however, fell into decline after the city's annexation to Italy in 1922. The Fascist government promoted several development schemes in the 1930s, with new manufacturing activities dedicated to shipbuilding and defence production (such as the "Cantieri Aeronautici Navali Triestini (CANT)"). Allied bombings during World War II destroyed the industrial section of the city (mainly the shipyards). However, starting from the 1970s, Trieste has experienced steady economic growth.

Since the fall of the Iron Curtain, the accession of Slovenia, Croatia, Hungary, the Czech Republic and Slovakia to the EU and the increasing importance of the maritime Silk Road to Asia and Africa across the Suez Canal, trade has seen an increase in Trieste. The Port of Trieste is a major trade hub in the northern Mediterranean, with significant commercial shipping activity and busy container and oil terminals. The port has been included in the Silk Road scheme because of its ability to dock container ships with very large drafts. Because of this natural advantage, the Port of Hamburg (HHLA) and the State of Hungary have holdings in the port area of Trieste and the associated facilities have been expanded by the Italian state in 2021 with an investment of €400 million. The port is now being promoted as a key terminal for the India-Middle East-Europe economic Corridor (IMEC) and the Indo-Mediterranean. It is considered strategic for Europe due to its position which can connect various trade routes as well as reinforce trade with the Ukrainian port of Odesa.

The oil terminal is a key infrastructure in the Transalpine Pipeline, which covers 40% of Germany's energy requirements (100% of the states of Bavaria and Baden-Württemberg), 90% of Austria and 50% of the Czech Republic's. The sea highway connecting the ports of Trieste and Istanbul is one of the busiest RO/RO [roll on roll-off] routes in the Mediterranean. The port is also Italy's and the Mediterranean's greatest coffee port, supplying more than 40% of Italy's coffee. The city is part of the Corridor 5 project to establish closer transport connections between Western and Eastern Europe, through countries such as Slovenia, Croatia, Hungary, Ukraine and Bosnia.

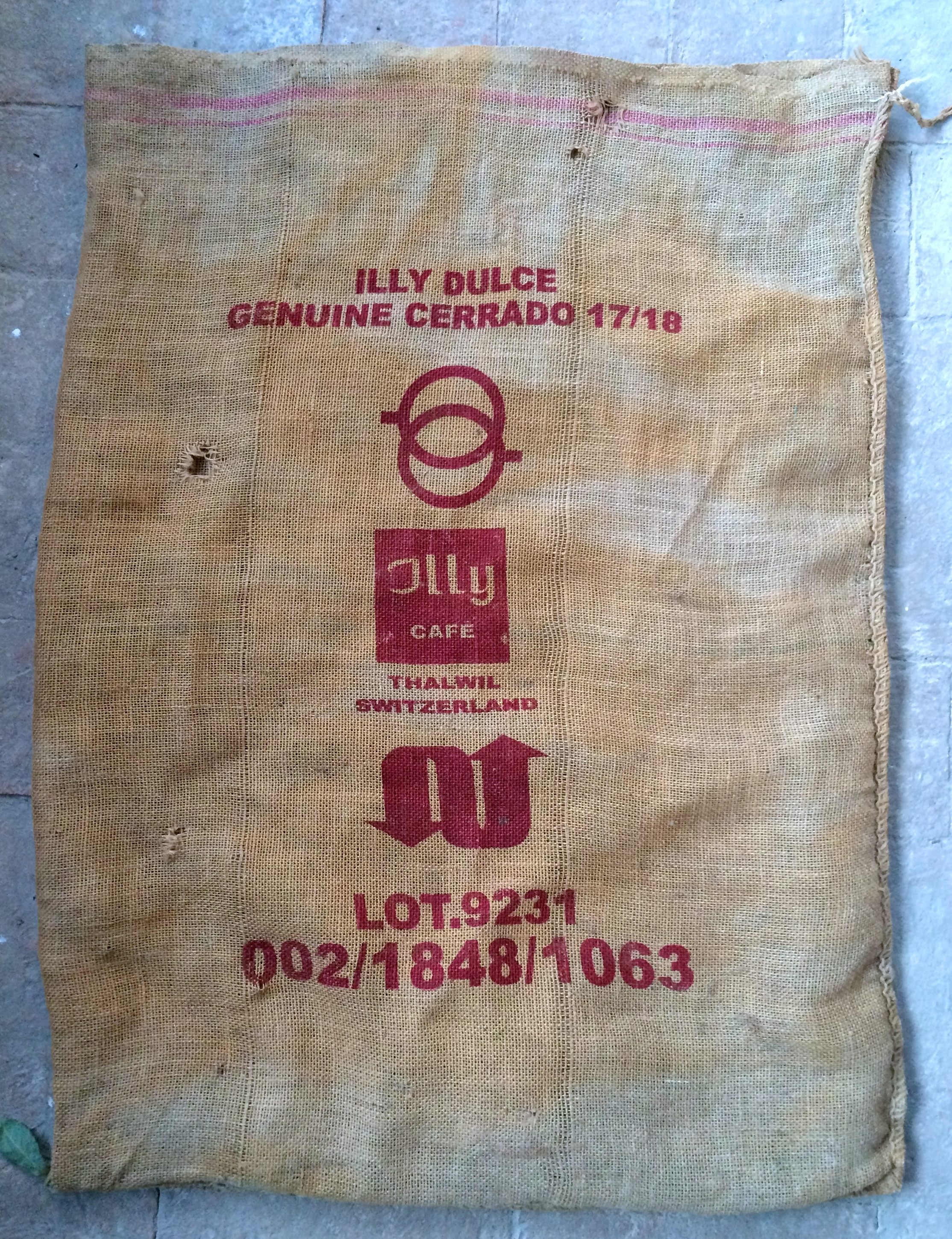
One of many coffee sacks that are traded by a Trieste company

The thriving coffee industry in Trieste began under Austria-Hungary, with the Austro-Hungarian government even awarding tax-free status to the city in order to encourage more commerce. Some evidence of Austria-Hungary's coffee-driven economic growth stimulus remain, such as the Hausbrandt Trieste coffee company. As a result, present-day Trieste is characterised by its many cafes, and is still known to this day as "the coffee capital of Italy". Companies active in the coffee sector have given birth to the Trieste Coffee Cluster as their main umbrella organisation, but also as an economic actor in its own right. A large part of Italian coffee imports (approx. 2–2.5 million sacks) are handled and processed in the city.

Two Fortune Global 500 companies have their global or national headquarters in the city, respectively: Assicurazioni Generali and Allianz. Other corporations based in Trieste are Fincantieri, one of the world's leading shipbuilding companies, and the Italian operations of Wärtsilä. Prominent companies from Trieste include: AcegasApsAmga (Hera Group), Adriatic Assicurazioni SpA Autamarocchi SpA, Banca Generali SpA (BIT: BGN), Genertel, Genertellife, HERA Trading, the coffee company Illy, the shipping line Italia Marittima, Modiano, Nuovo Arsenale Cartubi Srl, Jindal Steel and Power Italia SpA; Pacorini SpA, Siderurgica Triestina (Arvedi Group), TBS Group, U-blox, Telit, and polling and marketing company SWG.

The real estate market in Trieste has been growing in recent years. The relevant land register law comes from old Austrian legislation and was adopted by the Italian legal system after 1918 in Trieste, as well as in the provinces of Trento, Bolzano and Gorizia as well as in some municipalities of the provinces of Udine, Brescia, Belluno and Vicenza.

=== Commercial fishing ===
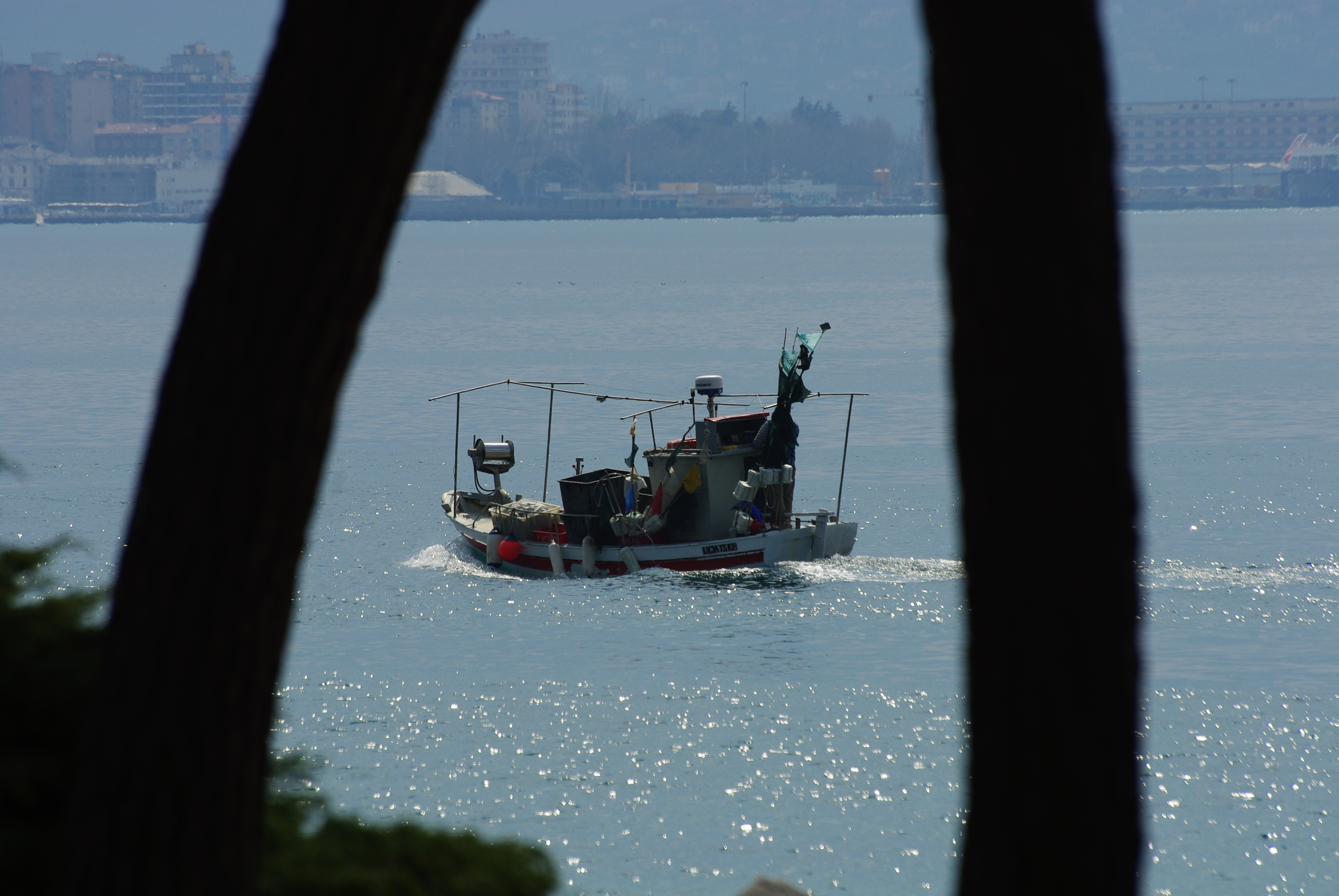
Professional fisherman's boat in Barcola, a suburb of Trieste

Fishing boats anchor at Molo Veneziano near Piazza Venezia. In summer lampare (large lamps) are used for fishing and in autumn and winter redi di posta (smaller fishing nets) are used. In the Gulf of Trieste, because of the crystal-clear, nutrient-poor water with little plankton, fishing in itself is challenging. The fishing season lasts from May to July. In terms of fish reproduction, fishing is prohibited in August and restricted in winter. As of 2009, there are fewer than 200 professional fishermen in the city. There is also a small fishing port in the suburb Barcola. Some of the fish is sold directly from the boats or delivered to the town's shops and restaurants. The rare alici ([anchovies - in the local dialect: Sardoni barcolani) from the Gulf of Trieste near Barcola, which are only caught at Sirocco, are particularly sought after because of their white meat and special taste and fetch high prices for fishermen.

== Transport ==
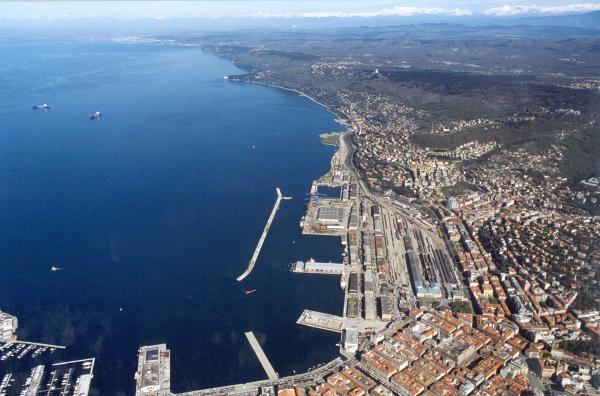
The Porto Vecchio, also showing Trieste Centrale railway station

=== Maritime ===
Trieste's maritime location and its former long-term status as part of the Austrian Empire—later the Austro-Hungarian Empire—made the Port of Trieste the major commercial port for much of the landlocked areas of central Europe. In the 19th century, a new port district known as the Porto Nuovo was built northeast of the city centre.

Significant volumes of goods pass through the container, steel works and oil terminals, all located to the south of the city centre. After many years of stagnation, a change in the leadership placed the port on a steady growth path, recording a 40% increase in shipping traffic as of 2007.

Today the port of Trieste is one of the largest Italian ports and next to Gioia Tauro the only deep water port in the central Mediterranean for seventh generation container ships.

=== Rail ===
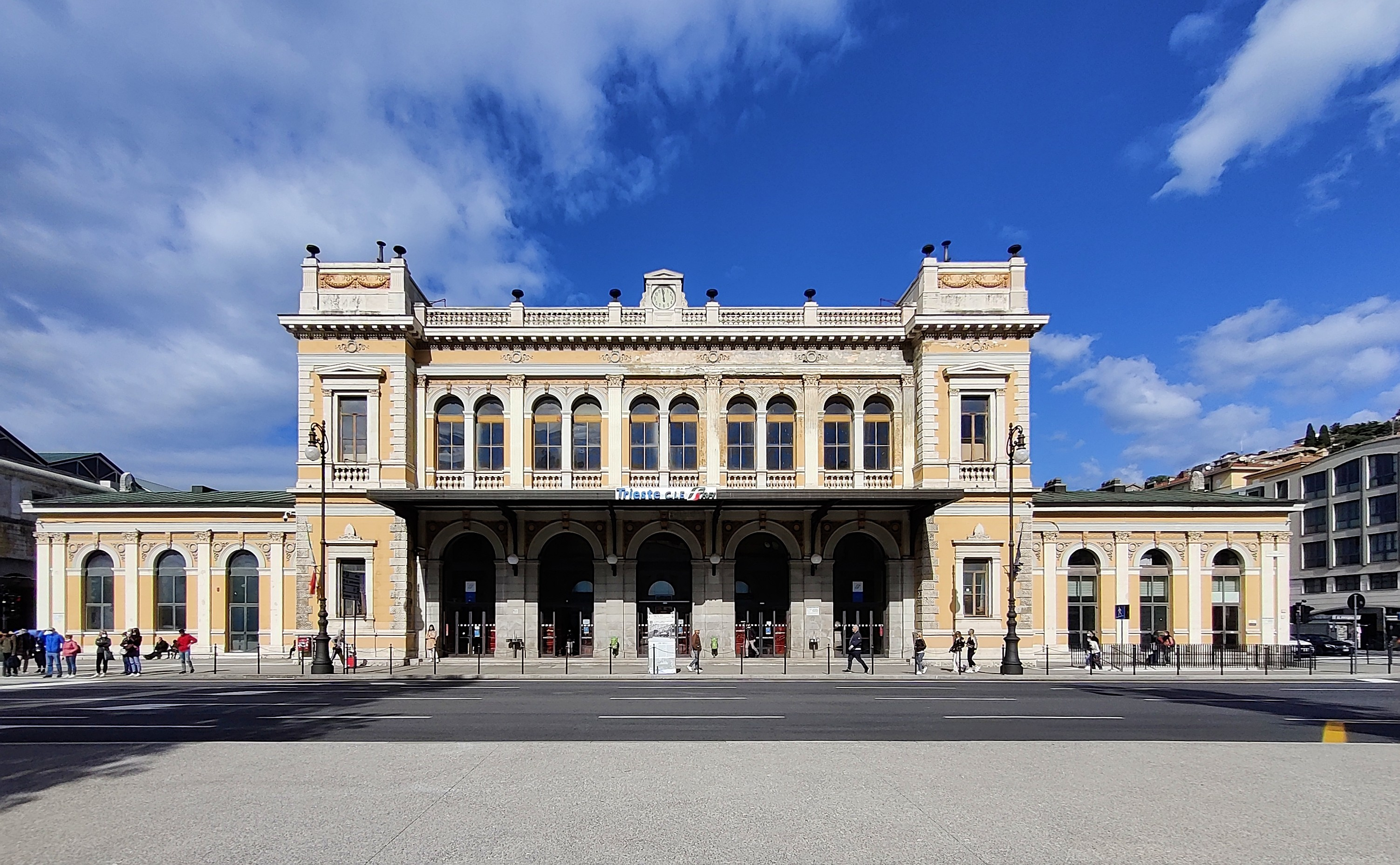
Trieste Centrale railway station

Railways came early to Trieste, due to the importance of its port and the need to transport people and goods inland. The first railroad line to reach Trieste was the Südbahn, built by the Austrian government in 1857. This railway stretches for 1,400 km (870 mi) to Lviv, Ukraine, via Ljubljana, Slovenia; Sopron, Hungary; Vienna, Austria; and Kraków, Poland, crossing the backbone of the Alps mountains through the Semmering Pass near Graz. It approaches Trieste through the village of Villa Opicina, a few kilometres from the centre but over 300 metres (984 feet) higher in elevation. Due to this, the line takes a 32 kilometres (20 miles) detour to the north, gradually descending before terminating at the Trieste Centrale railway station.

In 1887, the Imperial Royal Austrian State Railways (German: kaiserlich-königliche österreichische Staatsbahnen) opened a new railway line, the Trieste–Hrpelje railway (German: Hrpelje-Bahn), from the new port of Trieste to Hrpelje-Kozina, on the Istrian railway. The intended function of the new line was to reduce the Austrian Empire's dependence on the Südbahn network. Its opening gave Trieste a second station south of the original one, which was named Trieste Sant'Andrea (German: Triest Sankt Andrea). The two stations were connected by a railway line that in the initial plans was meant to be an interim solution: the Rive railway (German: Rive-Bahn), which survived until 1981, when it was replaced by the Galleria di Circonvallazione, a 5.7-kilometre (3.5 mi) railway tunnel route to the east of the city.

With the opening of the Transalpina Railway from Vienna, Austria via Jesenice and Nova Gorica in 1906, the St. Andrea station was replaced by a new, more capacious, facility, named Trieste stazione dello Stato (German: Triest Staatsbahnhof), later Trieste Campo Marzio, now a railway museum, and the original station came to be identified as Trieste stazione della Meridionale or Trieste Meridionale (German: Triest Südbahnhof). This railway also approached Trieste via Villa Opicina, but it took a rather shorter loop southwards towards the sea front. Freight lines from the dock area include container services to northern Italy and to Budapest, Hungary, together with rolling highway services to Salzburg, Austria and Frankfurt, Germany.

There are direct intercity and high-speed trains between Trieste and Venice, Verona, Turin, Milan, Rome, Florence, Naples and Bologna. Passenger trains also run between Villa Opicina and Ljubljana.

On special occasion, the historic ETR 252 "Arlecchino" runs the Venezia Santa Lucia-Trieste Centrale route, operated by Fondazionefs. This is one of four examples ever built.

=== Air ===
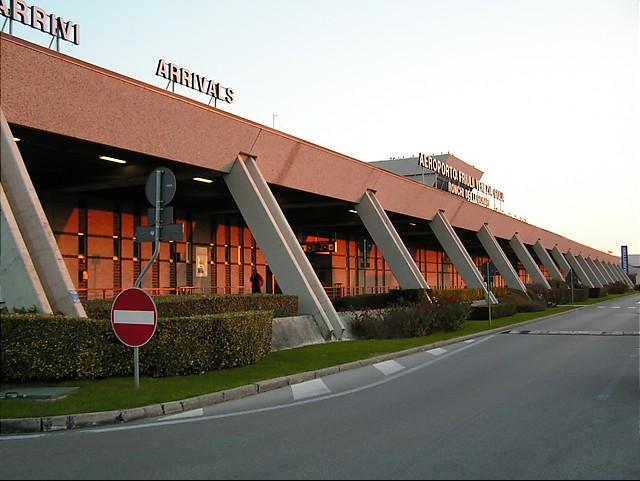
Trieste Airport

Trieste is served by the Trieste Airport (IATA: TRS). The airport serves domestic and international destinations and is fully connected to the national railway and highway networks. The Trieste Airport railway station links the passenger terminal directly to the Venice–Trieste railway thanks to a 425-metre long skybridge. A 16 platform bus terminal, a multi-storey car park with 500 lots and a car park with 1,000 lots give public and private motor vehicles rapid access to the A4 Trieste-Turin highway. At the interchange near Palmanova, the A4 branches off to Autostrada A23 linking to Austria's Süd Autobahn (A2) via Udine and Tarvisio. In the southern direction, this highway also offers seamless interconnection to Slovenia's A1 Motorway, and through that to highway networks in Croatia, Hungary, and the Balkans.

=== Local transport ===
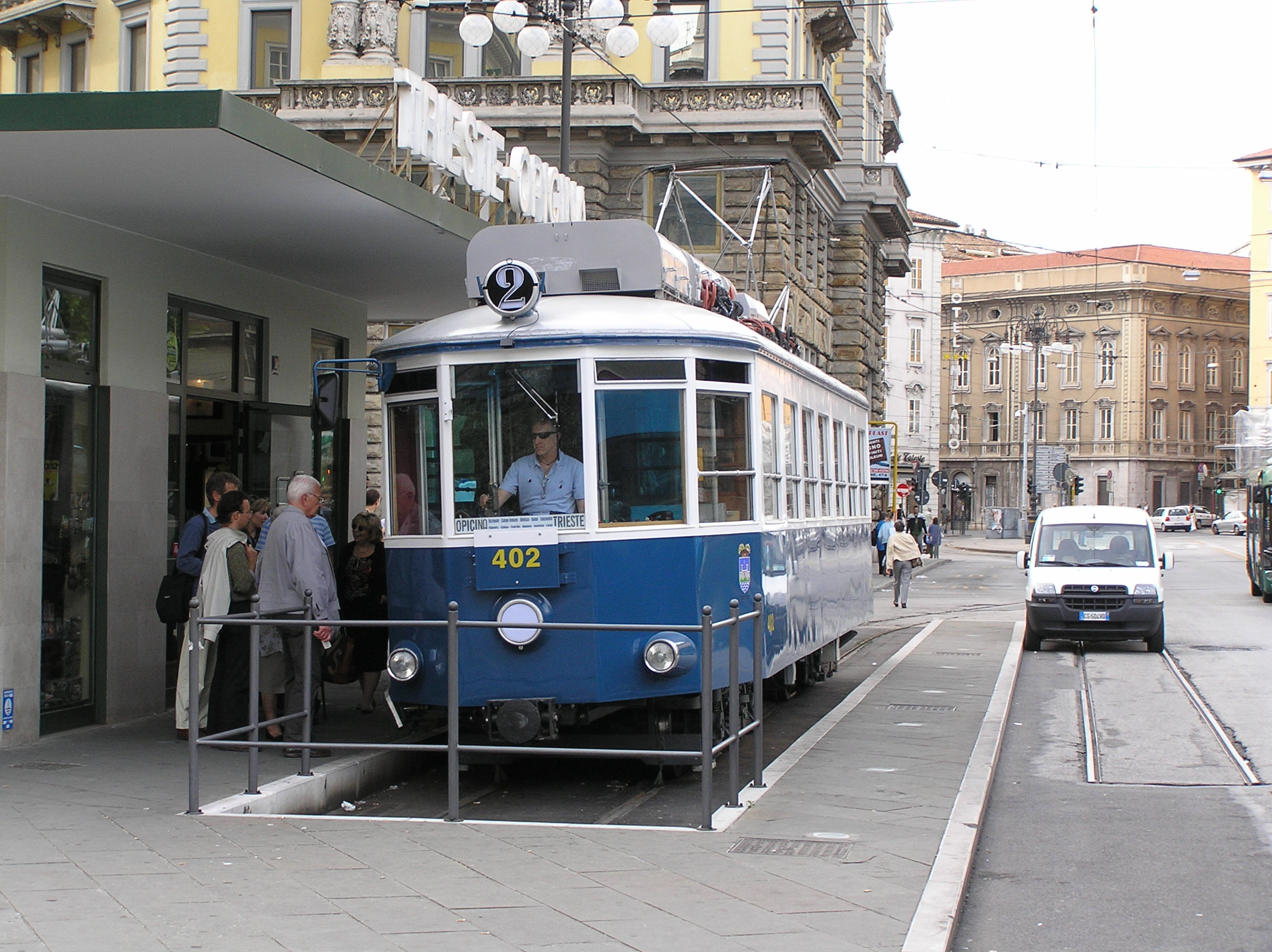
A car of the Opicina Tramway

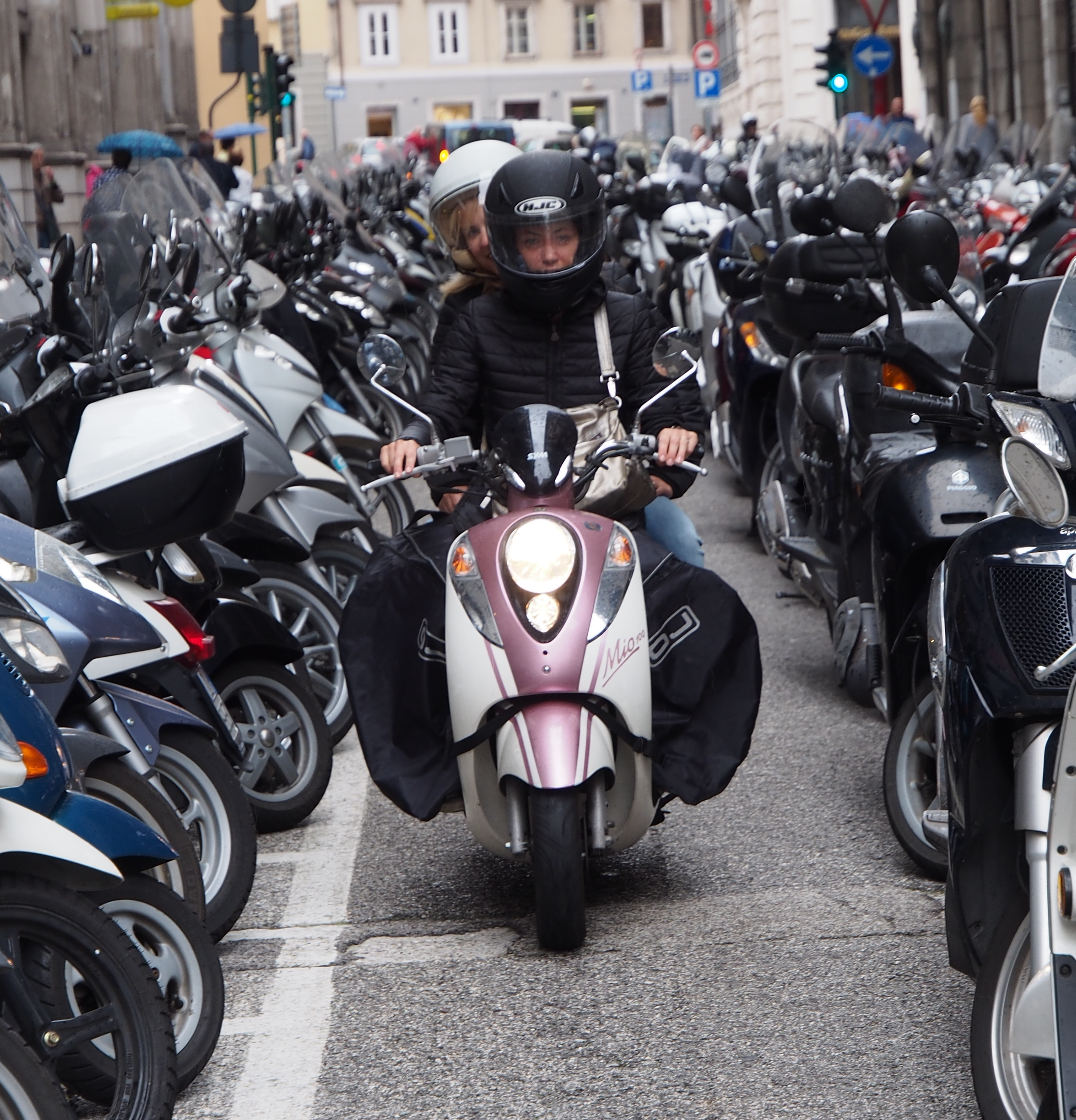
Scooters are used as personal transport in Trieste.

Local public transport is operated by Trieste Trasporti, a part of TPL FVG, which operates a network of around 60 bus routes and two ferry lines. Its also operates the Opicina Tramway, a hybrid between a tramway and funicular railway, providing a more direct link between the city centre and Opicina.

== Education and research ==
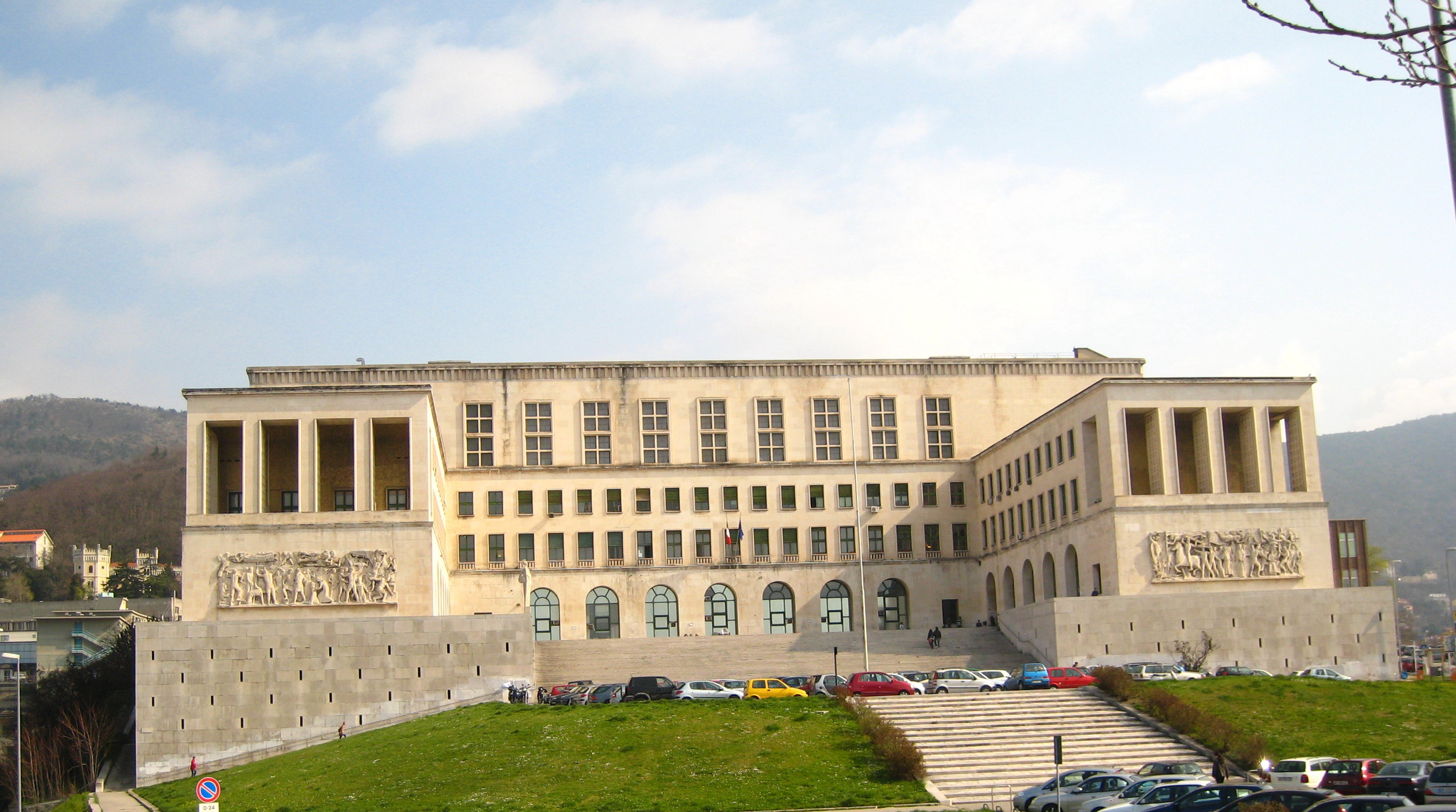
University of Trieste

The University of Trieste, founded in 1924, is a medium-size state-supported institution with 12 faculties. It currently has about 23,000 students enrolled and 1,000 professors. Trieste also hosts the Scuola Internazionale Superiore di Studi Avanzati (SISSA), a leading graduate and postgraduate teaching and research institution in the study of mathematics, theoretical physics, and neuroscience, and the MIB School of Management Trieste.

There are three international schools offering primary and secondary education programmes in English in the greater metropolitan area: the International School of Trieste, the European School of Trieste, and the United World College of the Adriatic located in the nearby village of Duino.

Research institutions such as the International Center for Theoretical Physics (logo), SISSA and the International Union of Pure and Applied Physics are located in Trieste around Barcola.

The city also hosts numerous national and international scientific research organizations:

- AREA Science Park,
- ELETTRA, a synchrotron particle accelerator with free-electron laser capabilities for research and industrial applications,
- International Centre for Theoretical Physics, which operates under a tripartite agreement among the Italian Government, UNESCO, and International Atomic Energy Agency (IAEA),
- Trieste Astronomical Observatory,
- Istituto Nazionale di Oceanografia e Geofisica Sperimentale (OGS), which carries out research on oceans and geophysics;
- International Centre for Genetic Engineering and Biotechnology, a United Nations centre of excellence for research and training in genetic engineering and biotechnology for the benefit of developing countries,
- ICS-UNIDO, a UNIDO research centre in the areas of renewable energies, biofuels, medicinal plants, food safety and sustainable development,
- Carso Center for Advanced Research in Space Optics,
- The World Academy of Sciences (TWAS),
- InterAcademy Panel: The Global Network of Science Academies (IAP),
- International Union of Pure and Applied Physics (IUPAP)
- Istituto nazionale di oceanografia e di geofisica sperimental, a national public scientific research organisation carrying out multidisciplinary studies in the field of earth sciences,
- Istituto Nazionale di Fisica Nucleare (Italian National Institute for Nuclear Physics),
- Laboratorio di Biologia Marina,
- Laboratory TASC Technology and Nano Science,
- Orto Botanico dell'Università di Trieste, Civico Orto Botanico di Trieste.

Trieste is also a hub for corporate training and skills development, hosting, among others, Generali's Generali Academy and Illy's Università del Caffé. This competence centre was created in 1999 to spread the culture of quality coffee through training all over the world and to carry out research and innovation.

As a result of the combination of research, business and funding, there are a growing number of spin-off companies in Trieste (partnerships in the production world exist with companies such as Cimolai, Danieli, Eni, Fincantieri, Generali, Illy, Mitsubishi, Vodafone) and proportionally the highest number of start-ups in Italy, the city also being referred to as Italy's Silicon Valley. Neurala, a company specialising in artificial intelligence, has chosen Trieste as its European research centre. Trieste has the highest proportion of researchers in Europe in relation to the population.

== Media ==
Newspapers

- Il Piccolo
- Primorski dnevnik
- La Gazzetta Giuliana

Broadcasting
Television

- RAI Friuli-Venezia Giulia
- Tele Quattro

Radio

- Radioattività Trieste
- Radio Fragola
- Radio Punto Zero

Publishing

- Asterios Editore
- Lint Editoriale

== Sports ==
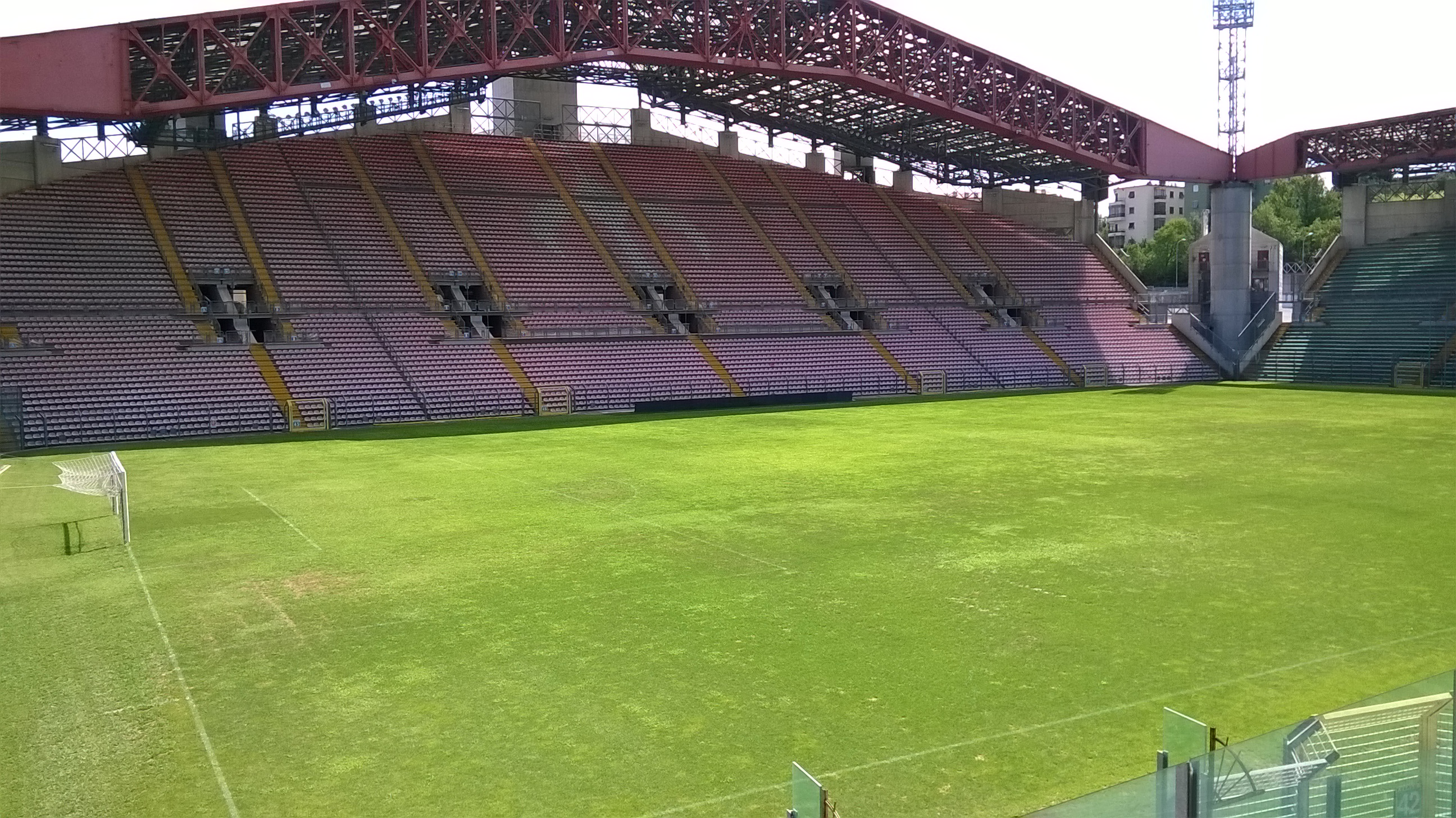
Stadio Nereo Rocco

The local football club, US Triestina, is one of the older clubs in Italy. Notably, it was runner-up in the 1947–1948 season of the Italian first division (Serie A), losing the championship to Torino.

Trieste is notable for having had two football clubs participating in the championships of two different nations at the same time during the period of the Free Territory of Trieste, due to the schism within the city and region created by the post-war demarcation. US Triestina played in the Italian first division (Serie A). Although it faced relegation after the first season after the Second World War, the FIGC modified the rules, as it was deemed important to keep the club in the league. The following year the club played its best season with a 3rd-place finish. Meanwhile, Yugoslavia bought A.S.D. Ponziana, a small team in Trieste, which under the new name Amatori Ponziana Trst, played in the Yugoslavian league for three years. Triestina went bankrupt in the 1990s, but after being re-founded, it regained a position in the Italian second division (Serie B) in 2002. Ponziana was renamed "Circolo Sportivo Ponziana 1912" and currently plays in Friuli-Venezia Giulia Group of Promozione, which is the 7th level of the Italian league.

Trieste also has a well-known basketball team, Pallacanestro Trieste, which reached its zenith in the 1990s under coach Bogdan Tanjević when, with large financial backing from sponsors Stefanel, it was able to sign players such as Dejan Bodiroga, Fernando Gentile and Gregor Fučka, stars of European basketball. At the end of the 2017–18 season, the team, now trained by coach Eugenio Dalmasson and sponsored by Alma, won promotion to the Lega Basket Serie A, Italy's highest basketball league, 14 years after its last tenure.

Many sailing clubs have roots in the city which contribute to Trieste's strong tradition in that sport. The Barcolana regatta, first held in 1969, is the world's largest sailing race by number of participants.

Local sporting facilities include the Stadio Nereo Rocco, a UEFA-certified stadium with seating capacity of 32,500; the Palatrieste, an indoor sporting arena sitting 7,000 people, and Piscina Bruno Bianchi, a large Olympic size swimming pool.

On 26 August 1985, American basketball player Michael Jordan dunked so hard that the backboard shattered during a Nike exhibition game played in Trieste. The signed jersey and shoes (including one of the tiny shards of glass in the sole of the left shoe) that the player wore during the famous shattered backboard game were later auctioned. The moment the glass broke was filmed and is often cited as a particularly important milestone in Jordan's rise.

The historically most successful handball club in Italy, Pallamano Trieste is based in the city.

== International relations ==
Trieste hosts the Secretariat of the Central European Initiative, an inter-governmental organisation among Central and South-Eastern European states.

In recent years, Trieste has been chosen as host to a number of high level bilateral and multilateral meetings such as: the Western Balkans Summit in 2017; the Italo-Russian Bilateral Summit in 2013 (Letta-Putin) and the Italo-German Bilateral Summit in 2008 (Berlusconi-Merkel); the G7 meeting of education ministers in 2024; the G8 meetings of Foreign Affairs and Environment Ministers, respectively in 2009 and 2001. In December 2020, Trieste hosted three-party talks between the foreign ministers of Italy, Croatia, and Slovenia on the delimitation of their respective exclusive economic zone. In 2020, Trieste was nominated the European Science Capital by EuroScience. In August 2021, it hosted the G20 Meeting of Ministers of Innovation and Research.

=== Sister cities – twin towns ===
Trieste is twinned with:

- Beirut, Lebanon (since 1956)
- Douala, Cameroon (since 1971)
- Graz, Austria (since 1973)
- Santos, Brazil (since 1977)
- (United Kingdom) Southampton, England (since 2002)
- Le Havre, France
- Mykolaiv, Ukraine (since 1997)

== See also ==
- Abdus Salam International Centre for Theoretical Physics (ICTP)
- Bathyscaphe Trieste, Swiss-designed, Italian-built deep sea exploration vehicle
- History of the Jews in Trieste
- INFN (National Institute of Nuclear Physics)
- International School for Advanced Studies (SISSA)
- Teatro Comunale Giuseppe Verdi
- Treaty of peace with Italy (1947)
