= History of Trieste =

History of the Italian city

The history of Trieste began with the formation of a modestly sized town in pre-Roman times; it became a city only after Roman conquest in the second century BC and subsequent colonization. After the Roman imperial era, the city declined following barbarian invasions, becoming only marginally important during the next millennium. The city changed rulers several times and then became a free city, which joined the House of Habsburg in 1382. During the 18th and 19th centuries, Trieste experienced a period of new prosperity because of its status as a free port and the development of a thriving shipping industry. This industry made Trieste one of the most important cities in the Austrian Empire (after 1867, Austria-Hungary).

During the Habsburg period, this multi-ethnic city remained Italian-speaking, and it became a leading Italian and European cultural centre. It was incorporated into the Kingdom of Italy in 1922 after World War I. After World War II, the city was the capital of the Free Territory of Trieste, remaining under Allied military administration for nine years. Following the London Memorandum in 1954, Trieste was annexed by Italy. Since 1963, the city has been the capital of the Friuli-Venezia Giulia region.

== Prehistory to Middle Ages ==
=== Prehistory ===
The earliest evidence for human habitation was found at the Riparo di Visogliano archaeological site, where the remains of Homo heidelbergensis individuals living 500,000–350,000 years ago were found.

The territory currently occupied by Trieste and its hinterland first became a stable home for humans during the Neolithic period. In the late Bronze Age, the Castellieri culture began to be developed by pre-Indo-European peoples.

=== Pre-Roman and Roman ===
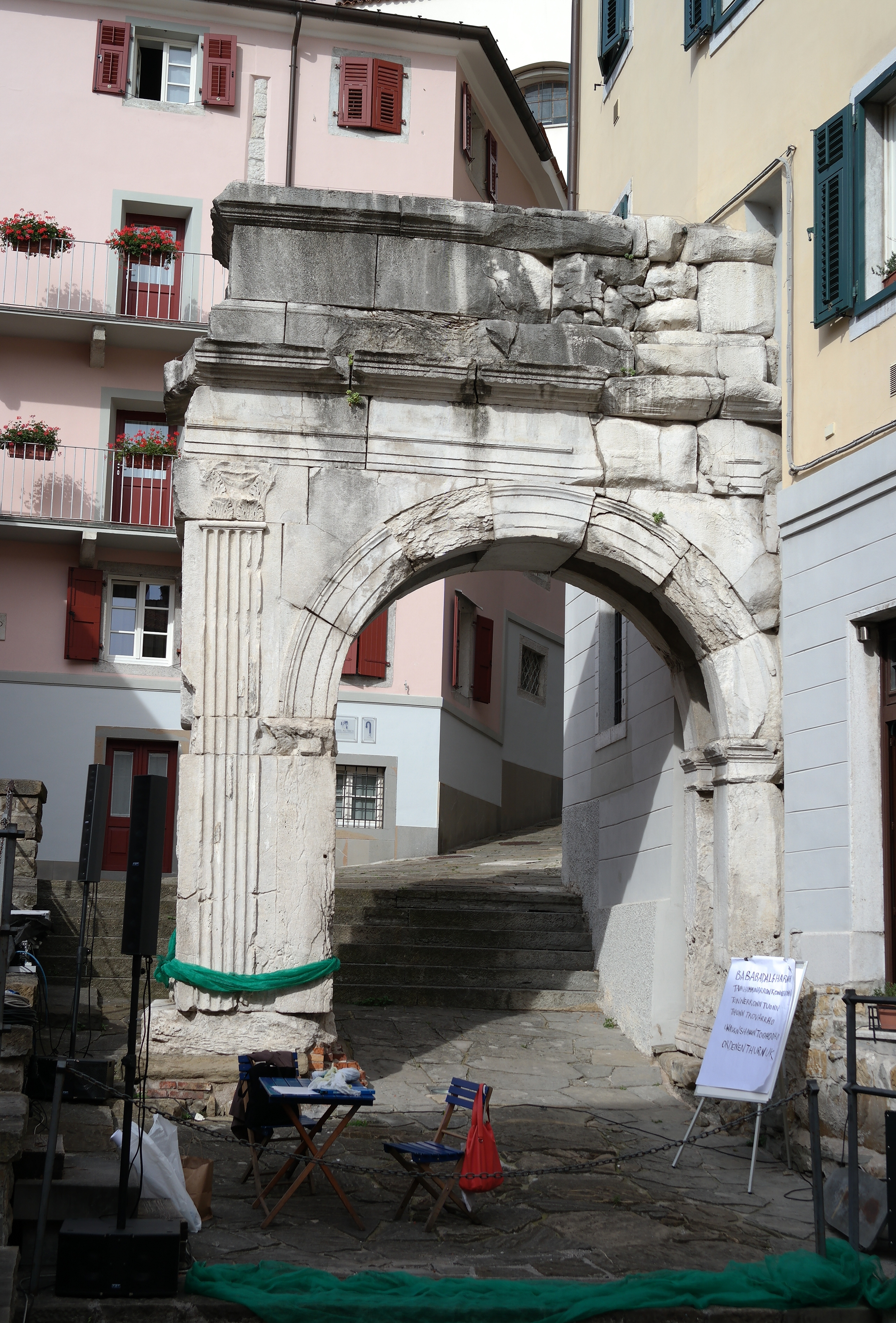
Roman arch known as the Arco di Riccardo

According to the historical record, the first groups of Indo-Europeans in the Trieste area appeared in the 10th century BC: the Histri people. The foundation of what later became the Roman town of Tergeste has been attributed to the Adriatic Veneti people, as evidenced by the Venetic language roots of the name Tergeste ("Terg" and "Este") and other important findings. The Greek historian Strabo, however, attributed the foundation of Tergeste to the Gaulish tribe of Carni, who settled the Eastern Alps during classical antiquity.

After the Romans conquered the Istrian peninsula in 177 BC, the town became a Roman municipality called Tergeste, developing and acquiring an urban physiognomy by the Augustan Age (at the beginning of the 1st millennium). Roman Tergeste reached its peak during the rule of the emperor Trajan in the early 2nd century AD. According to Triestine historian Pietro Kandler, the town's population at the time was around 12,000 to 12,500, a number that the city reached again only in the 1760s.

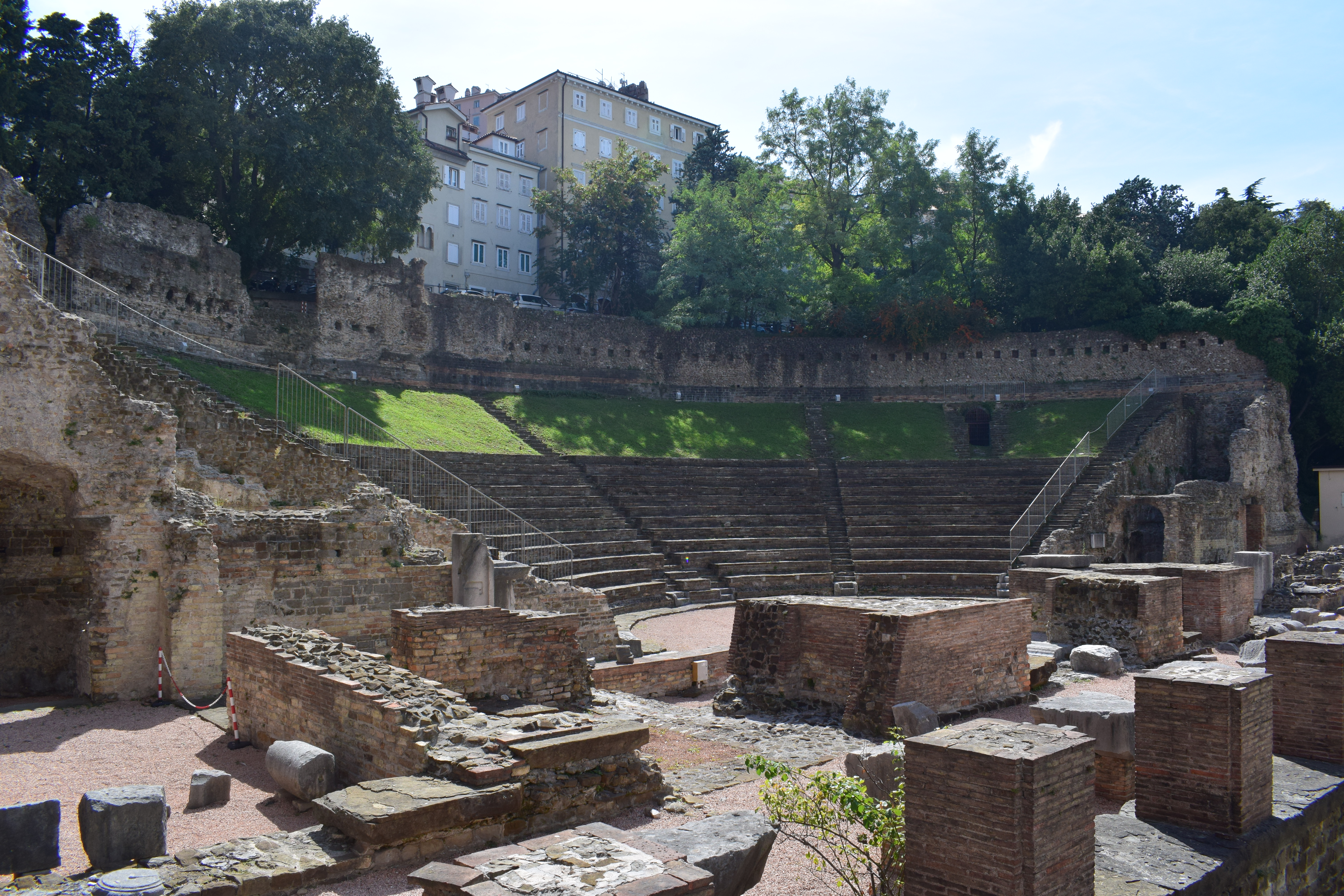
Roman theatre in Trieste

In the lower part of the San Giusto hill in the city's historic centre are the remains of the ancient Roman settlement, despite the modern buildings that partially block the view. Two buildings stand as a testimony to the importance of Tergeste in Roman times: the theatre, dating from the end of the 1st century BC (and later expanded under Trajan), with a seating capacity of about 6,000 spectators; and the early Christian basilica, built between the 4th and 5th centuries, which contains notable mosaics, a sign of the prosperity enjoyed by the local church and the city of Tergeste during the late imperial period of Roman history.

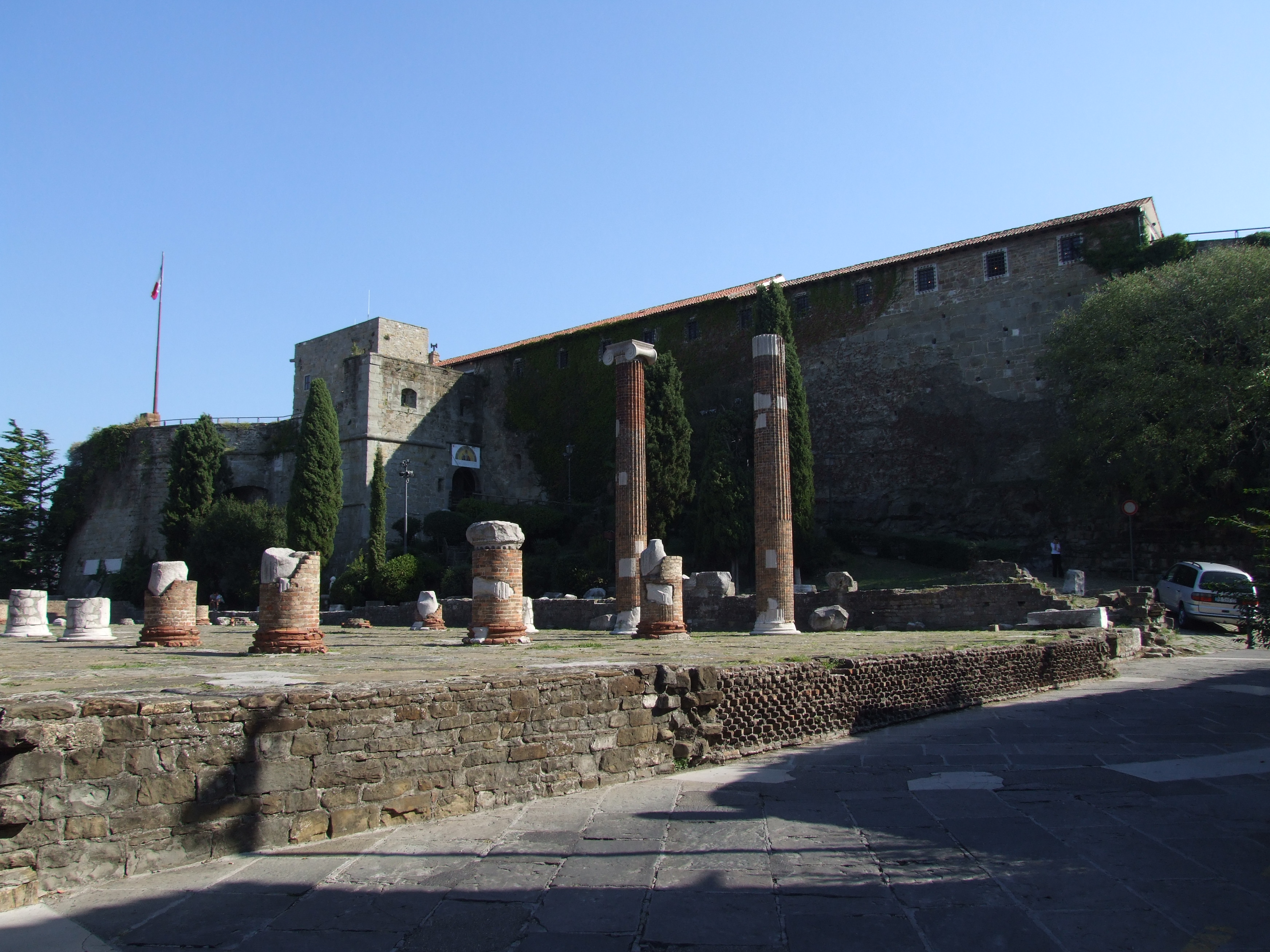
Roman ruins in front of San Giusto Castle

The remains of Roman temples dedicated to the gods Jupiter and Athena, also built on the San Giusto hill, are still visible. The latter has been preserved as architectural structures built into the foundations of Trieste Cathedral. These are visible from the exterior through openings in the walls of the cathedral's bell tower, as well as underground. (Underground access is via the Municipal Museum of History and Art.) Another ancient Roman monument that has survived in fair condition is the Roman Arch (Italian: Arco di Riccardo), an ancient city gate built in the second half of the 1st century BC. In addition, remains of Roman villas owned by local nobility have been found in Barcola, Grignano and other settlements along the coast, built mostly during the 1st and 2nd centuries AD.

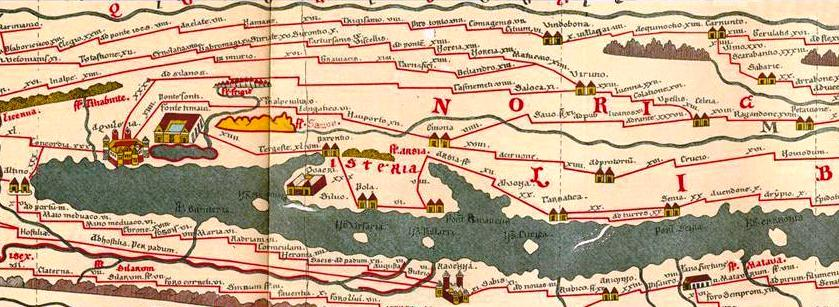
The city of Tergeste seen on the Tabula Peutingeriana map, which showed the Roman Empire during the time of Augustus

Essential for the development of Tergeste in Roman times was Via Flavia – the road connecting the city with Pola (present-day Pula in Croatia) along the coast of Istria – which was built in 78–79 AD during the reign of Emperor Vespasian. Tergeste also had a seaport and a series of small-scale harbours along the coast: at the San Vito promontory; at Grignano, near several patrician villas; at Santa Croce, and elsewhere. During this period, the city's water was supplied by two aqueducts, one to nearby Bagnoli and the other to San Giovanni di Guardiella.

=== From barbarian invasions to free municipality ===
After anarchy paralysed the region after the fall of the Western Roman Empire, Trieste was initially part of the Kingdom of Italy ruled by Odoacer, and later by his successor Theodoric the Great. During the Gothic War (535–554), Trieste was occupied by the Roman emperor Justinian I, who transformed the town into a military colony of the Byzantine Empire. A few years later, the city was destroyed by the Lombards (in 568, when they invaded, or more likely in 585). Rebuilt during the following decades, though now reduced in size, Trieste passed on to the Franks in 788; their sovereignty was recognized by Byzantine emperors in 812.

During the 8th century, the missionary work of priests from the Bishopric of Salzburg and the Patriarchate of Aquileia led to the Christianization of the local Slavic communities. Since the early 9th century, the Franks allowed these communities to settle in the depopulated areas of the Istrian peninsula, as far as the northern areas near Trieste, as documented in the Placitum of Riziano.

In 948, the king Lothair II of Italy passed the government of Trieste to Bishop Joannes III and his successors, who then enjoyed considerable autonomy while preserving feudal ties with the Kingdom of Italy. Throughout the bishops' rule, the city was forced to defend itself against expansionist ambitions of the powerful patriarchs of Aquileia, Venice and later the Counts of Gorizia. The bishops' rule was in crisis around the middle of the 13th century: incessant wars and quarrels – especially with Venice – had emptied the city's coffers, forcing the bishops to discard certain important prerogatives related to rights that were sold to citizens. Among the latter were judicial rights, the collecting of tithe, and the right to mint coins. The city therefore developed a civil administration, dominated by the elders of the city, which gradually replaced the church. This process culminated in 1295, when bishop Brisa de Topo formally renounced his last prerogatives and relinquished the government of Trieste to the local community, thereby establishing Trieste as a free municipality.

== Trieste and the Habsburgs: from free city to international port ==
=== Austrian orbit of influence ===
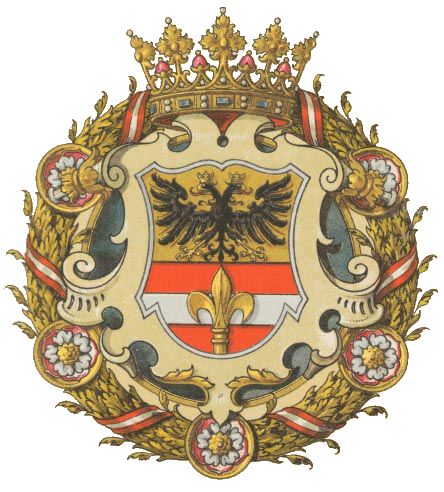
Trieste's coat of arms under Austria-Hungary

After becoming a free city, Trieste faced new and increasingly powerful pressures, both military and economic, from the Republic of Venice, which sought to impose its hegemony in the Adriatic Sea. The demographic, financial and military disparity between the two cities portended Trieste's rapid fall under Venetian influence and the loss of its independence, as had previously happened in many Istrian and Dalmatian urban centres. In 1368, another dispute with Venice resulted in a Venetian siege of Trieste that lasted 11 months, and the occupation of Trieste by the Venetians from November 1369 to June 1380. The persistent struggle to resist Venetian influence eventually led Trieste to place itself under the protection of the Duchy of Austria, which was committed to respecting and protecting the city's integrity and civic freedom. (The latter were largely reduced from the second half of the 18th century.)

=== Creation of free port and urban development ===
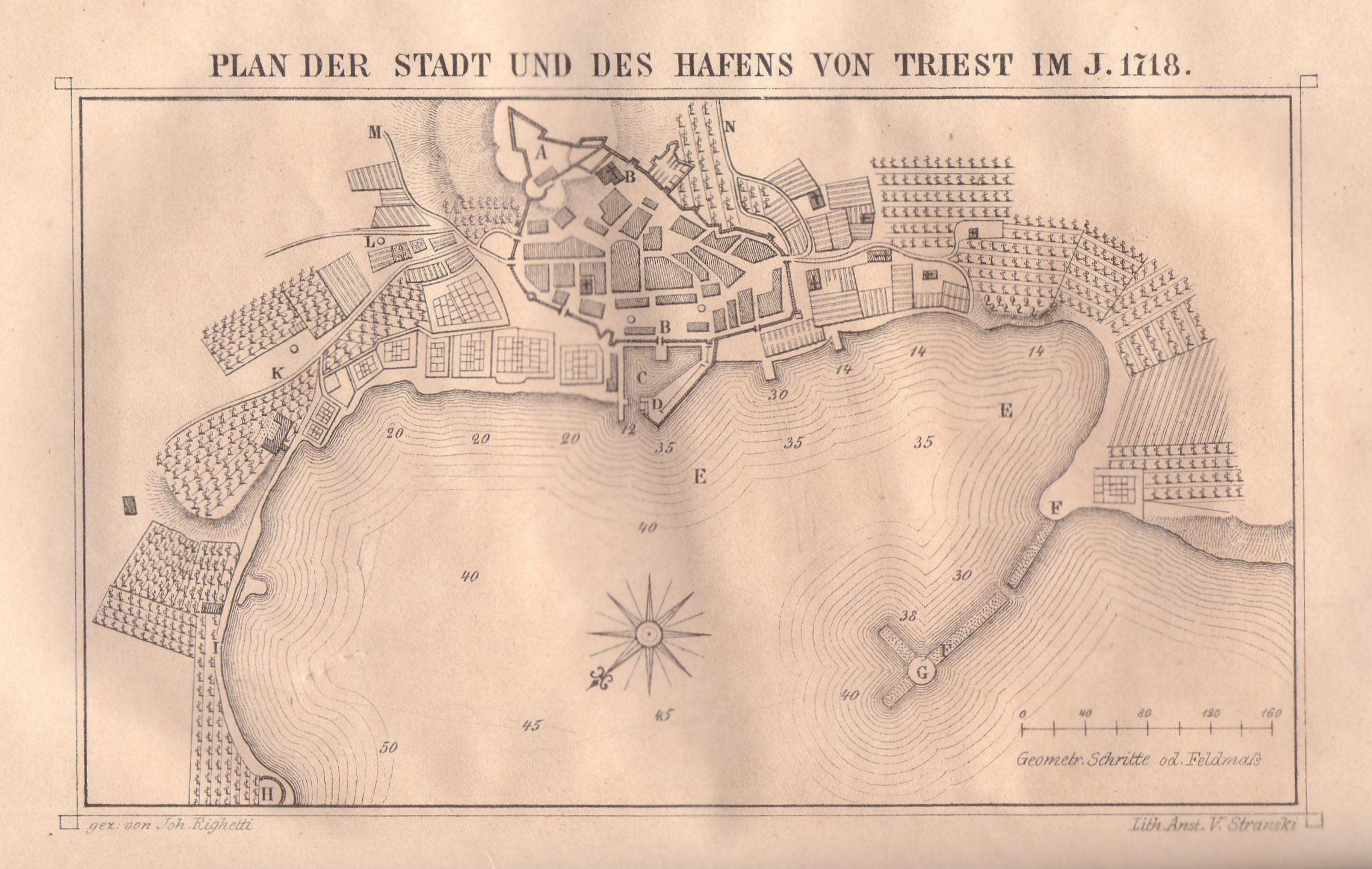
Trieste before the creation of the free port.

In 1719, the Holy Roman Emperor Charles VI of Habsburg created a free port in Trieste; the port's privileges would be extended during the reign of his successor to include the Chamber of Deputies electoral district (1747) and then the entire city (1769). After the emperor's death (in 1740), the young Maria Theresa of Austria acceded to the throne, and because of a careful economic policy, the city became one of the main European ports and the biggest in the empire. The Theresian government invested considerable capital in expanding and upgrading the city's port. Between 1758 and 1769, preparations for defence buildings were made, and a fort was created. Close to the port rose the Stock Exchange (inside the Municipal Palace, around 1755); the Palace of the Lieutenancy (1764); a department store; and the first shipyard in Trieste, known as the shipyard of Saint Nicholas. During that period, construction began on a new neighbourhood, which still bears the name of the Empress; this neighbourhood was built to accommodate the city's growing population that would reach about 30,000 inhabitants by the end of the century, six times greater than in the previous hundred years.

The city's significant population growth was due, for the most part, to the arrival of many immigrants, primarily from the Adriatic Basin (Venetian Istria, Dalmatia, Friuli and Slovenia) and, to a lesser extent, from continental Europe (Austria and Hungary) and the Balkans (Serbia, Greece, etc.). Serbs settled in Trieste mainly during the 18th and 19th centuries, mostly from Herzegovina and the Bay of Kotor. Though initially small in number, these immigrants soon formed an influential and rich community within the city. A number of Serb traders owned important businesses and constructed palaces across Trieste, many of which still stand.

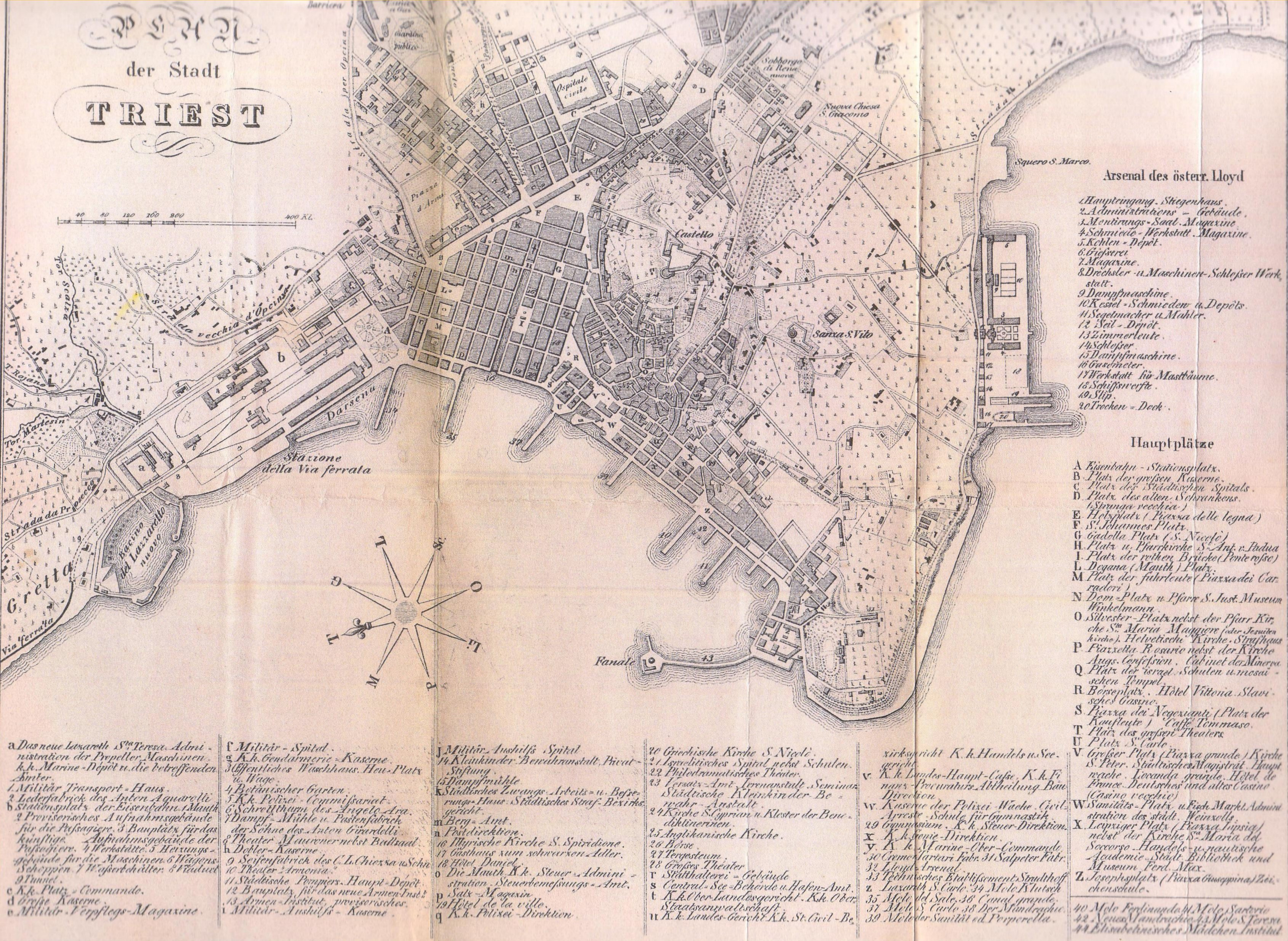
Trieste in 1857, 138 years after the creation of the free port, at the introduction of the railway

Trieste was occupied three times by Napoleon's troops in 1797, 1805 and 1809; during these short periods, the city lost its ancient autonomy with the consequent suspension of free-port status. The first French occupation was brief, beginning in March 1797 and lasting only two months. A large part of the population had abandoned the city in advance of the imminent arrival of Napoleon's troops; however, the Napoleonic government proved to be less revolutionary than the citizens expected, so many returned to the city during the following days. Napoleon visited Trieste on 29 April, and his troops left the city in May following the Peace of Leoben armistice. The second French occupation lasted from December 1805 until March 1806. Despite the short duration of the first two occupations, the democratic ideas brought by French troops began spreading in Trieste, which started to develop an Italian identity.

The city's third occupation began on 17 May 1809, and starting on 15 October, Trieste was annexed to the Illyrian Provinces of the First French Empire. This occupation ended on 8 November 1813, when Trieste was captured by the Habsburgs at the conclusion of the Siege of Trieste.

Under the Habsburgs, Trieste continued to grow, thanks to the opening of the Austrian Southern Railway in 1857. During the 1860s, the city was elevated to the rank of state capital of the Austrian Littoral region (Oesterreichisches Küstenland). During the last decades of the 19th century, the city became the fourth largest urban area in the Austro-Hungarian Empire (after Vienna, Budapest and Prague).

The city's commercial and industrial development during the second half of the 19th century and the first 15 years of the 20th century (with 30,000 employees in the secondary sector in 1910) led to the creation and development of pockets of social exclusion. At the time, Trieste had a high infant mortality rate – higher than that of Italian cities – and one of the highest tuberculosis rates in Europe. These factors deepened the increasing gap between the countryside, populated mostly by ethnic Slovenes, and the city proper, with its Italian language and traditions.

=== Ethnic and linguistic groups during the Habsburg age ===
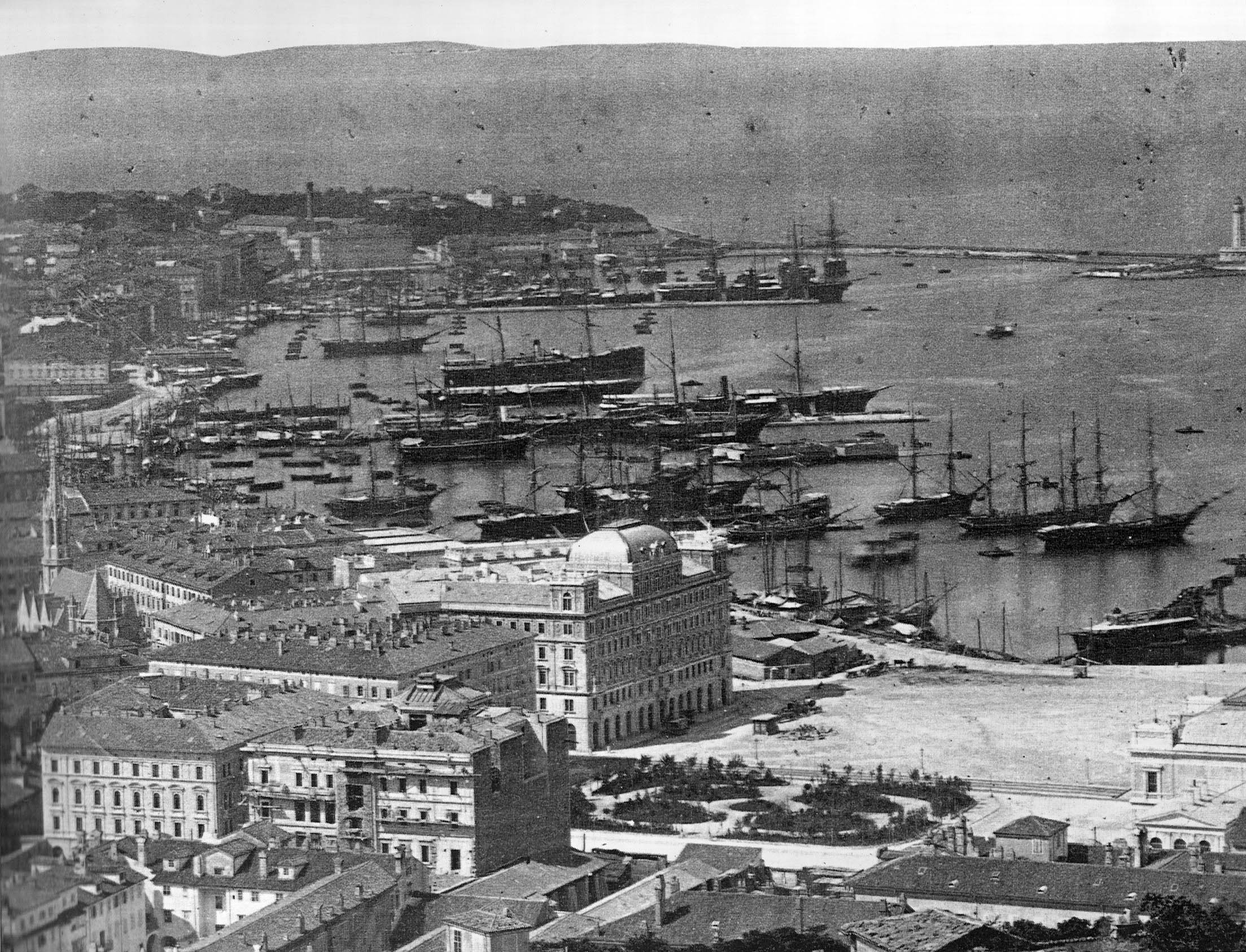
Trieste in 1885

During the Middle Ages and up to the early 19th century, inhabitants of Trieste spoke Tergestino, a Rhaeto-Romance dialect, although the primary language used for official purposes and in cultural life was Latin throughout the Middle Ages. At the end of the medieval period (14th and 15th centuries), use of the Italian language began to spread (though spoken as a mother tongue by only a small minority); later, in the latter part of the 18th century, German became more widely used, although it was confined to the administrative sphere.

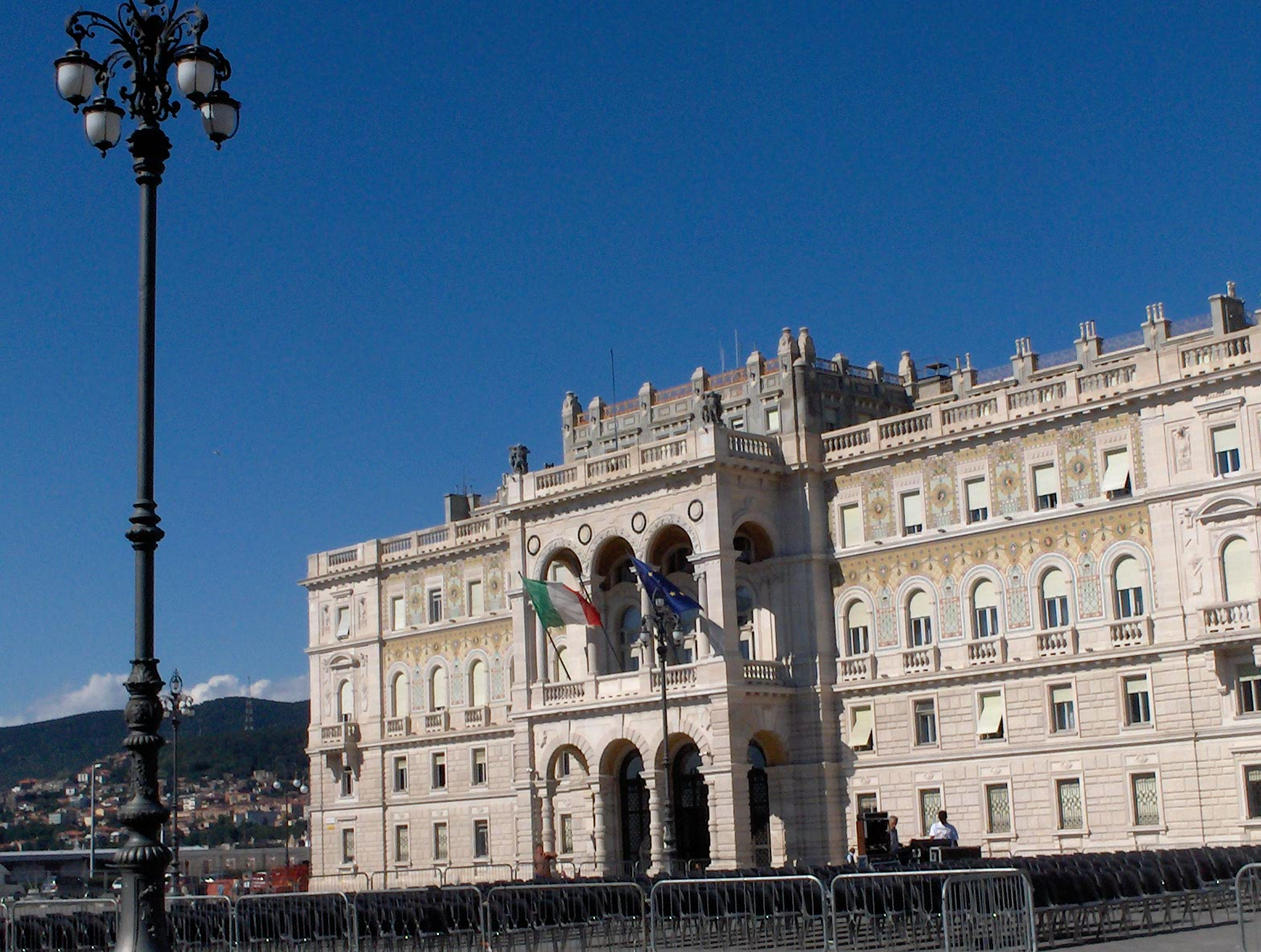
Palace of the Habsburg government, today the seat of the local prefecture

After the free port was established and the great migration began in the 18th century, demographic changes intensified in the next century (with a clear predominance of Venetians, Dalmatians, Istrians, Friuli and Slovenes). Tergestina gradually lost ground to the Venetian language. Tergestina was imposed primarily as a written language and culture; however, the Venetian language spread, between the last decades of the 18th and early 19th centuries, as a real lingua franca in Trieste. Among linguistic minorities that acquired considerable weight in the city during the second half of the 19th century were the Slovenes (present in the Karst Plateau, Italian Carso, since medieval times); on the eve of World War I, they represented about a fourth of the municipality's total population.

Thanks to its privileged status as the only important commercial port in Austria, Trieste continued to maintain close cultural and linguistic ties with Italy; despite German being the official language, by the late Habsburg period, Italian became the dominant language in all formal contexts, including the following:

- business – both on the stock market and in private transactions
- education – in 1861 an Italian school was opened by the city, joined to the existing Austro-German school
- written notices – the vast majority of publications and papers were written in Italian
- the municipal council – the political class in Trieste was mostly Italian-speaking

According to the contested Austrian census of 1910, the distribution of Trieste's 229,510 inhabitants (including a number of locations in the centre and the surrounding plateau); this occurred as a result of the revision by language of use was as follows:

- 118,959 (51.8%) spoke Italian
- 56,916 (24.8%) spoke Slovenian
- 11,856 (5.2%) spoke German
- 2,403 (1.0%) spoke Serbo-Croatian
- 779 (0.3%) spoke other languages
- 38,597 (16.8%) were foreign nationals who were not asked for their language of use, including the following:
  - 29,639 (12.9%) were Italian citizens
  - 3,773 (1.6%) were Hungarian citizens.

Of the total population surveyed, more than 98,872 inhabitants (43%) were not born in the municipality of Trieste, but in other territories under Austrian sovereignty (71,940 registered inhabitants, 31.3%) or abroad (26,842 registered inhabitants, 11.7%). Among the latter, most were born in the Kingdom of Italy ("subjects of the Kingdom"); among the former, the most numerous colonies came from Gorizia and Gradisca (22,192 registered inhabitants), Istria (20,285 inhabitants surveyed), Carniola (11,423 registered inhabitants) and Dalmatia (5,110 registered inhabitants).

=== Trieste from 1861 to World War I ===
==== The national contrasts ====
Trieste's political and national struggles between 1861 and 1918 were the subject of a series of studies by historians of different nationalities. The interpretations and historiographical visions of this period are sometimes inconsistent with each other, and debate remains open, at least for some aspects and problems. These 60 years were marked by strong tensions. Ernesto Sestan highlights, during this period, the twofold defensive action by the Italian-speaking population, both against Viennese bureaucratic centralism and the spread of the Slav population. The two phenomena – especially during the second Taaffe ministry (1879–1893) – were sometimes concurrent, since the central government considered the Slavs to be more reliable. At the time, it was widely understood that the so-called Austro-Slavism was a political trend by which the Slavic-speaking populations aimed to achieve their national objectives within the Habsburg regime and with its cooperation.

==== Government policies towards Trieste ====
During this period, the dynamic city of Trieste was affected by the policies adopted by the Viennese authorities towards local institutions and the national question.

As early as February 1861, the imperial government had issued a licence that reduced the autonomy of legislative assemblies, with the aim of centralizing and Germanizing the empire's administration. This licence prompted reactions in Trieste, which resulted in a request to ensure the city's autonomy, emphasizing its Italian ethnic character.

This centralist policy was accompanied – especially after the Third Italian War of Independence of 1866 and, in general, the process of creating an Italian state – by a general distrust or hostility toward Italian ethnic populations in the empire, as well as their loyalty to the Austrian State and the Habsburg dynasty:

the events of 1866 strengthened in many Austrian politicians (among military leaders, conservative aristocracy and the imperial family) old suspicion of unfealty and the dangerousness of the Italian element for the Empire. [...] After 1866, the distrust of the conservative sectors of the ruling class towards Italians began to result in deliberate hostility.

Emperor Franz Joseph, in his Privy Council of 12 November 1866 – a few months after the end of the Third Italian War of Independence and the annexation of the Veneto and Friuli to the northernmost part of the Kingdom of Italy – imposed a policy to "Germanise and Slavonise in the strongest terms and without scruple ..." all Italian regions still part of his empire: Trentino, Dalmatia, and Venezia Giulia.

The minutes of the Habsburg Council of Ministers of 12 November 1866, with the directives of "Germanization and Slavonization", are well known to historians, who have frequently cited these minutes in their work. These minutes are discussed in a number of independent essays, written by scholars in different countries and years, providing various interpretations of possible outcomes and applications.

Historian Luciano Monzali writes:

The minutes of the Council of Ministers of the Habsburg end of 1866 show the intensity of the hostility anti-Italian emperor and the nature of its political guidelines in this regard. Franz Joseph was converted fully to the idea of the general element infidelity Italian and Italian-speaking towards the Habsburg dynasty in the Council of Ministers, November 2, 1866, he gave strict orders to oppose the influence of decisive way ' Italian element still present in some Kronländer, and aim for Germanization or slavicized, depending on the circumstances, of the areas in question with all the energy and without any regard [...] all central authorities were ordered to do so systematically. These anti-Italian sentiments expressed by the emperor, who would have had serious political consequences [...] in the following years, they were also particularly prominent in the army, which had fought many wars in Italy and was eager for revenge: considered the preponderant role of the military [...], it was extremely dangerous.

Thus was designed and developed the "floor of the Austrian conservative ruling class to pursue a policy of concessions to the Slavic nationalities, considered most loyal to the Empire and prepared to accept the power dominant Habsburg emperor and aristocracy."

The loss of Veneto as well as the greater part of Friuli to Italy – with their ports and qualified maritime personnel – further increased the economic and strategic importance of Trieste for the Habsburg Empire, as its main maritime and commercial outlet; this prompted the state to pay special attention to developing the city and expanding its infrastructure. This policy, inaugurated by Austria after the Third Italian War of Independence, was inspired by traditional choices since the beginning of the 18th century; these choices were to foster the potential of Trieste's geographical position, located roughly at the juncture of communication lines between Italy, Central Europe and the Balkans.

Special care was taken of the road and rail infrastructure between inland and the city (and its port), in order to ensure the optimal circulation of goods and people in both directions. The central government also paid attention to the city through its selection of imperial lieutenants, who were usually chosen from among prominent personalities.

The traditional maritime commercial sector was gradually joined by an industrial sector; this was promoted by the naval armament policy of the imperial government since the end of the 19th century, in competition with the neighbouring Kingdom of Italy and prompted by the prospect of Balkan expansion. The massive investments intended for naval rearmament naturally benefited Trieste, which had the appropriate facilities and personnel to carry out the proposed work. As a result, Trieste's industry – especially in sectors such as metallurgy and shipbuilding – underwent significant expansion. The decision by the imperial authorities in 1891 to limit traditional customs duties, first introduced in 1719, further contributed to this economic transformation.

In addition, Trieste was a significant administrative and financial centre for two reasons: the wealth accumulating through commerce or arriving with foreign investors; and the city's having become, by 1850, the headquarters of the so-called "Maritime Central Government", a body that regulated and controlled activities related to various aspects of trade in the administrative unit of the Austrian Littoral.

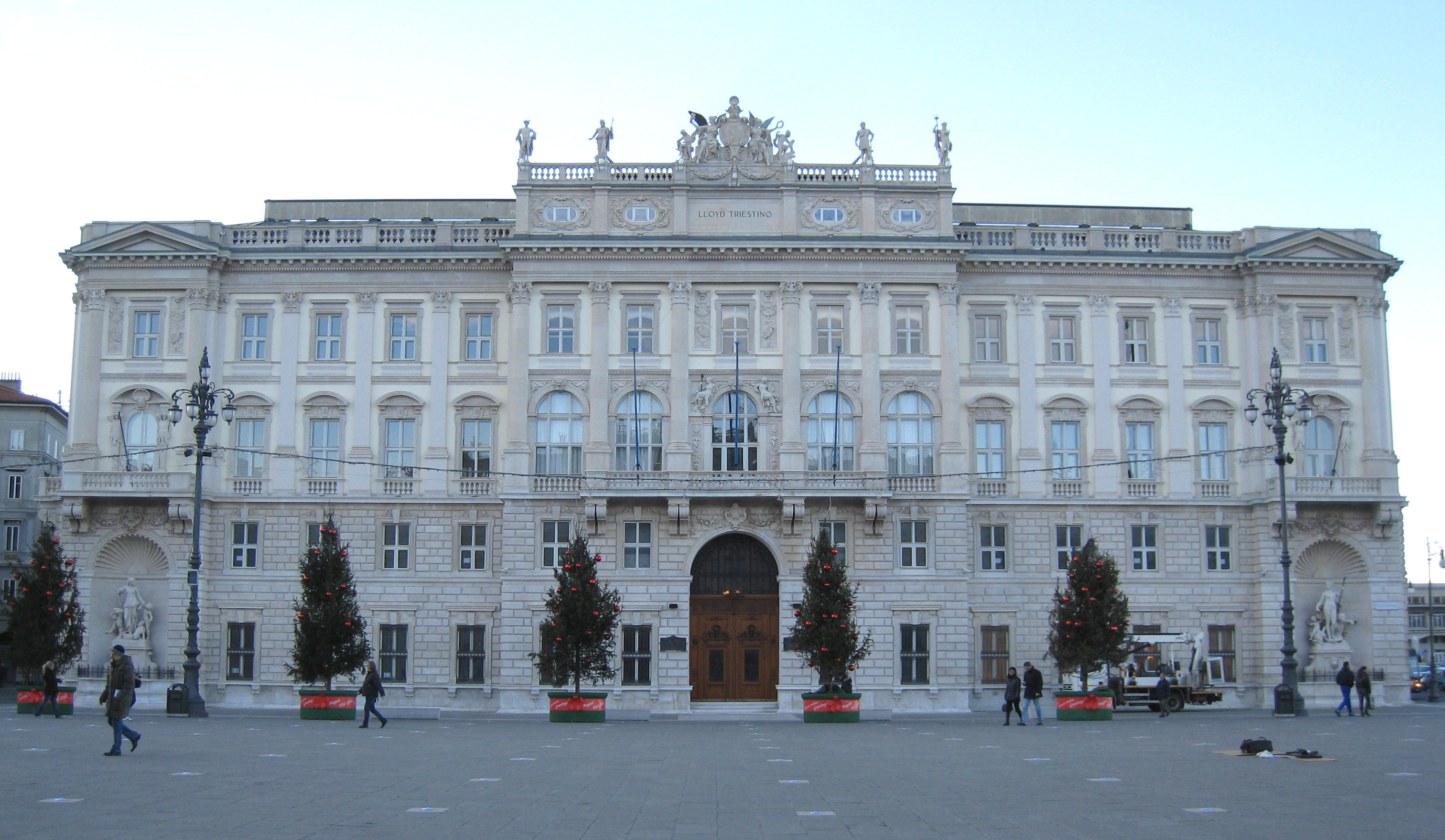
The historical headquarters of Lloyd Triestino, now the seat of the Friuli-Venezia Giulia Region.

A significant link between Vienna and Trieste was made by the shipping company Österreichischer Lloyd. Two crucial sectors of the economy in Trieste – shipping and insurance – had an important reference point in Lloyd, since the company could link public and private capital, as well as Viennese entrepreneurship and Trieste.

In the final decades of the 19th and early 20th centuries, Trieste therefore experienced significant economic development, favoured by a number of conditions:

- the historical context, consisting of European economic momentum and the intensity of world maritime trade, which experienced a golden age after the opening of the Suez Canal in Egypt
- the presence of an active urban fabric and a generally qualified workforce
- public investment and close trade ties with an extensive Central European hinterland made accessible through an infrastructure network

Tensions and political conflicts – internal to Trieste, as well as between the municipality and the central government – grew in the years (1904–1915) when Prince Konrad of Hohenlohe-Schillingsfürst was the imperial governor of the region, since he was a supporter of so-called trialism and followed a pro-Slavic policy. Trialism was a political project supported by Archduke Franz Ferdinand of Austria. (He was the designated heir to the throne of the emperor Francis Joseph and made regent at the time, given the emperor's age.) This project aimed to create a third Slavic kingdom within the empire, along with those of Austria and Hungary, that would have included Trieste and the Austrian Littoral. The Austrian government aimed "to weaken the powers and the political and economic strength of the city of Trieste controlled by the national-liberal Italian, rightly considering the heart of the national liberalism in Austria and irredentist tendencies". This project included the severing of "close political, cultural and social ties among liberals between Trieste and Italy ..."

==== The school problem ====
An issue that aroused strong interest and sometimes passions was schooling, because teaching was seen as an essential way to transmit and preserve national culture. The imperial educational system was complex and differentiated, because it was intended for multiple ethnic groups within the same state. To simplify, the following distinction applied to the city of Trieste during the period. First, there were primary schools where teaching was done in a familiar language (a paternal or maternal language) – or in the so-called "endeavoured" use of language by students routinely – but which required German as a second language. Second, there were secondary schools, which taught using either Italian – the language used by the majority of the population, as well as the educated class and business – or German – the official and administrative language of the empire. This complexity was increased in two ways: by state and municipal schools, institutions with parallel sections with different languages of instruction; and by substantial hours spent at some institutions in particular languages (Italian, German, and Slovenian), but as subjects of study rather than as languages of instruction.

The imperial authorities tried to spread teaching in German and, in part, Slovenian as far as possible. The textbooks themselves were subjected to strict censorship, with paradoxical results at times: examples include studying Italian literature in translation from German, and the prohibition on studying Trieste's history, which was deemed "too Italian".

Therefore, the Italian National League had, among its main objectives, the promotion of scholarly and educational institutions to culturally defend the Italian ethnic group.

Between 10 and 12 July 1868, protesters demonstrated in Trieste for academic freedom; these demonstrations followed a petition signed by 5,858 citizens and presented to the city council, demanding the right to use the Italian language in state schools. These demonstrations degenerated into clashes and violence in the main streets, with local Slovenes enlisted among the Habsburg soldiers. This violence caused the death of the student Rodolfo Parisi – killed after being stabbed 26 times with bayonets – and two workers, Sussa Francis and Nicholas Zecchia. In addition, even more violent clashes took place. In 1914, a scuffle took place between Italian and Slavic students at the High School of Commerce Pasquale Revoltella, relating to a language issue. The Slovenian Balcan university society intervened, theoretically in protest; as a result, a few days later (on 13 March 1914), more severe clashes occurred, which caused the death of an Italian student who was hit by a bullet during a shooting.

Another school issue that caused bitter division was a request to allow an Italian university to be established in Trieste. The request had been proposed since 1848 and had become more pressing after 1866, since students from Trieste (and, in general, ethnic Italians who were subjects of the empire) saw a new border between them and the Italian universities of Padua, where such students had previously studied. In principle, the Austrian state recognized the legitimacy of the request to establish an Italian university in Trieste. However, the state rejected this concession for two reasons: fear of displeasing the Slovenian ethnic group or seeing it propose a similar request; and an expectation that such a centre of culture and studies would eventually strengthen Italian irredentism.

==== The labour issue ====
The large urban, industrial and commercial centre of Trieste attracted significant migration from neighbouring regions, in both the empire and the Italian state. Immigrants of many nationalities arrived, but principally Italians and South Slavs. The Italian community began to fear that the empire favoured the immigration of Slavs over Italians.

However, Slavic migration towards Trieste was driven principally by socio-economic factors. Slovenes found work more easily in public service in a mixed-language zone for linguistic reasons, and they were often well-received by Italian employers in sectors ranging from industry to domestic work. The historian Ernesto Sestan noted that the imperial authorities distrusted immigrant Italians because these immigrants were citizens of a foreign state.

However, as recognized by the historian Angelo Ara, "undoubtedly there existed an imperial interest in strengthening the South-Slavic component, considered most loyal and 'centripetal' of the Italian": this attitude was recognized, for example, by the governor Hohenlohe in an official document. Sestan noted that the Austrian authorities promoted Slavic migration from the rural regions of Slovenia and Croatia, while impeding the migration of Italians from the Kingdom of Italy. For example, the Imperial Lieutenancy tried to include, on the list of dockworkers at the port of Trieste, Slovenes living in other municipalities of the Karst Plateau and Upper Carniola region. The imperial authorities appeared to be wary of subjects of the Kingdom of Italy and readily resorted to expulsion measures against them:

citizenship of the Kingdom of Italy [...] was sufficient motive for the Austrian authorities to make use of force when they believe appropriate, intervening with measures of forced eviction, with the most trivial pretexts; about 35,000 subjects of the Kingdom of Italy would be expelled in the decade from 1903 to 1913, up to the decrees of the lieutenant of Trieste Prince Konrad of Hohenlohe-Schillingsfürst.

This situation increased tensions between the different ethnic groups of Trieste. In 1913, Prince Hohenlohe issued another decree including the deportation of Italians. After this decree, Slavic nationalists held a public rally against Italy, followed by a demonstration, shouting "Viva Hohenlohe! Down with Italy! "; the nationalists then attempted to storm the Italian consulate.

Piazza della Borsa (ca. 1890–1906)

At the beginning of the 20th century, the rapid growth of Trieste's Slavic population was due to both social and economic factors, resulting from the politics of the empire and Hohenlohe (a trialist sympathizer). As a consequence, however, Trieste saw its Italian character eroded by Slavic immigration, and the ethnic Italian population could not experience similar demographic growth. The fears of Trieste's Italian community increased during this period in response to events in Dalmatia: "the decline of Italian Dalmatian-ness" that was "dramatically perceived by other Adriatic people and especially those from Trieste, which they attribute to the aggressive expansionism of South Slavs and governmental intervention", so that they saw in Dalmatia's situation "almost the anticipation of what could happen in the future in Trieste".

In addition to ethnic tensions, this period saw Trieste's working class starting to fight to improve its working conditions and salaries. The representative example was that of Österreichischer Lloyd, where workers began a strike in February 1902, and the company's management refused to meet their demands. Despite protests widening to involve other worker categories – and eventually the entire city – the company's management maintained its position. On 15 February, after news that Lloyd would bring the issue before an arbitration panel, some 3,000 protesters went from a socialist meeting at the Politeama Rossetti theatre towards the city centre to celebrate. Once they reached Piazza della Borsa, the demonstrators were stopped by the 55th infantry brigade under the command of Franz Conrad von Hötzendorf, which began shooting and charging the crowd with bayonets. More than 200 demonstrators were injured, and 14 were killed. During the following days, the arbitration panel granted two of the protesters' three demands.

==== National contrasts ====
The politics of Trieste between 1861 and 1918 have been subject to many studies by historians of different nationalities. The interpretations and historiographic visions of this period sometimes disagree with one another, and debate remains open. In any case, the period was marked by strong tensions.

Ernesto Sestan highlighted the two-pronged action carried out by the Italian population – against bureaucratic Viennese centralism and against the diffusion of Austro-Slavism. The two actions were combined during the Taaffe ministry because the central government saw the Slavic population as more reliable.

=== Irredentism and the Great War ===
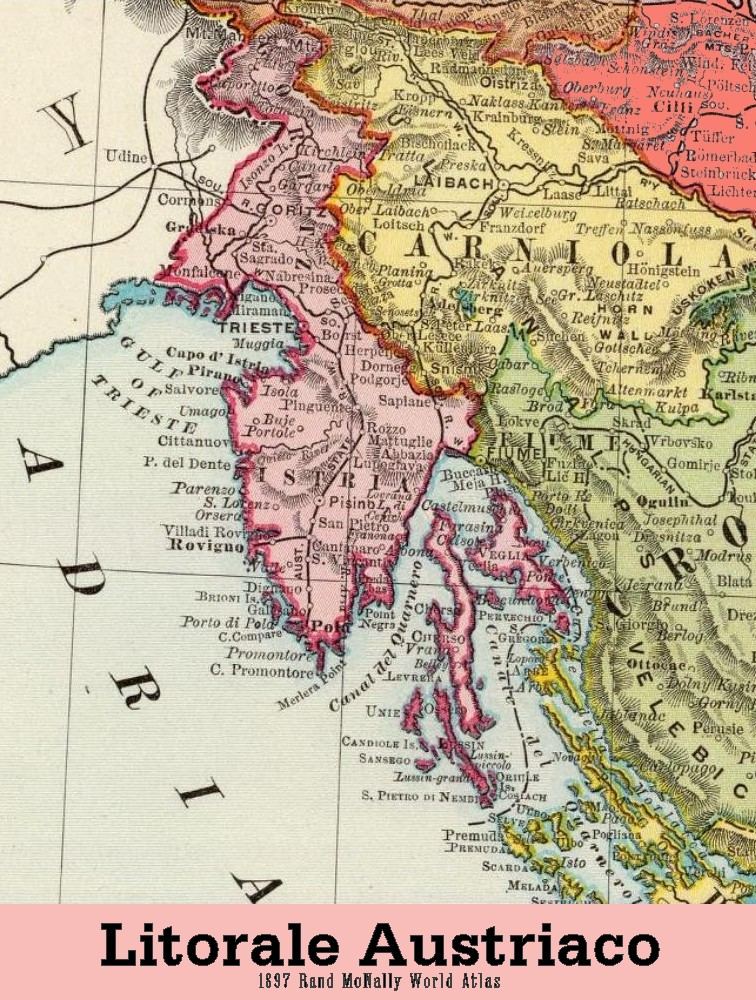
Map of the Austrian Littoral (1897 map)

The directives of the Habsburg imperial government promoted a series of repressive and discriminatory measures to the detriment of the Italian population of Trieste. However, these measures contributed in important ways to the spread of irredentist ideas within the Italian community, which felt that its existence was threatened by the joint actions of the Austrian Government and local Slavic nationalists.

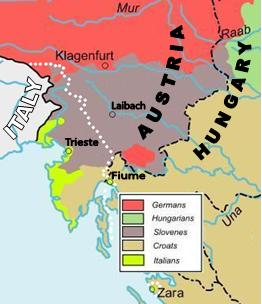
Ethnic makeup from the 1910 census; the white dotted line represents the border after World War I.

Trieste was, with the comune of Trento, both a subject and a centre of irredentism – a movement that, in the last decades of the 19th and early 20th centuries, aspired to the annexation of these cities to Italy. The drivers of irredentism in Trieste were primarily the rising bourgeois classes (including a wealthy Jewish colony) whose potential and political aspirations could not be satisfied in the Austro-Hungarian Empire. During the early 20th century, the Slovene ethnic group in Trieste was growing demographically, socially and economically; according to the controversial census of 1910, this group constituted about a quarter of the city's population. In Trieste, irredentism therefore often assumed a markedly anti-Slavic character, as exemplified by the writer Ruggero Timeus.

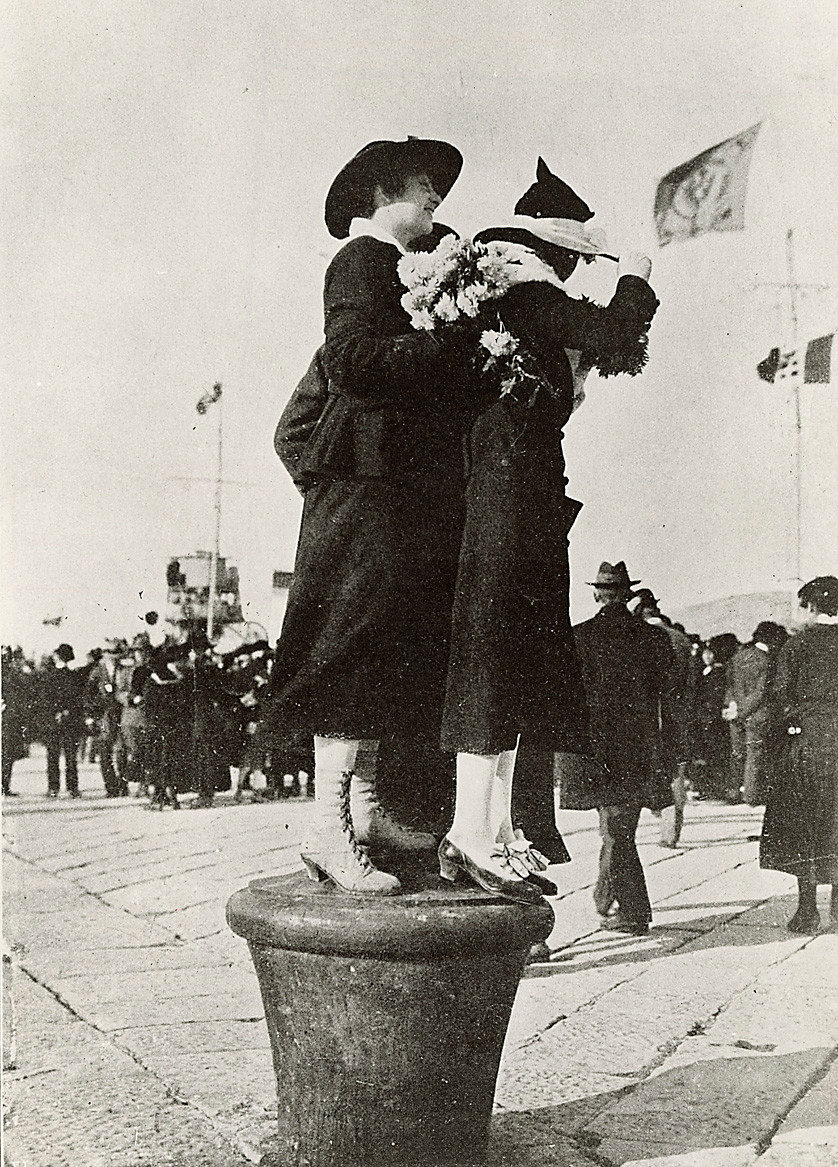
Women in Trieste throwing flowers at the passage of the King

The first martyr for the irredentist movement was the assassin Guglielmo Oberdan, who was tried and hanged in Trieste on 20 December 1882 for plotting to kill Emperor Franz Joseph. Closely tied to the Italian irredentist movement (and seen as such by the Austrian authorities) was the National League, the largest private organization in the city at the time, which grew to 11,569 members in 1912. On 23 May 1915, following news that Italy had declared war on Austro-Hungary, pro-Austrian demonstrators set fire to the headquarters of the National League, Palazzo Tonello; this housed the editorial office of the irredentist newspaper Il Piccolo and the irredentist sports association Società Ginnastica Triestina.

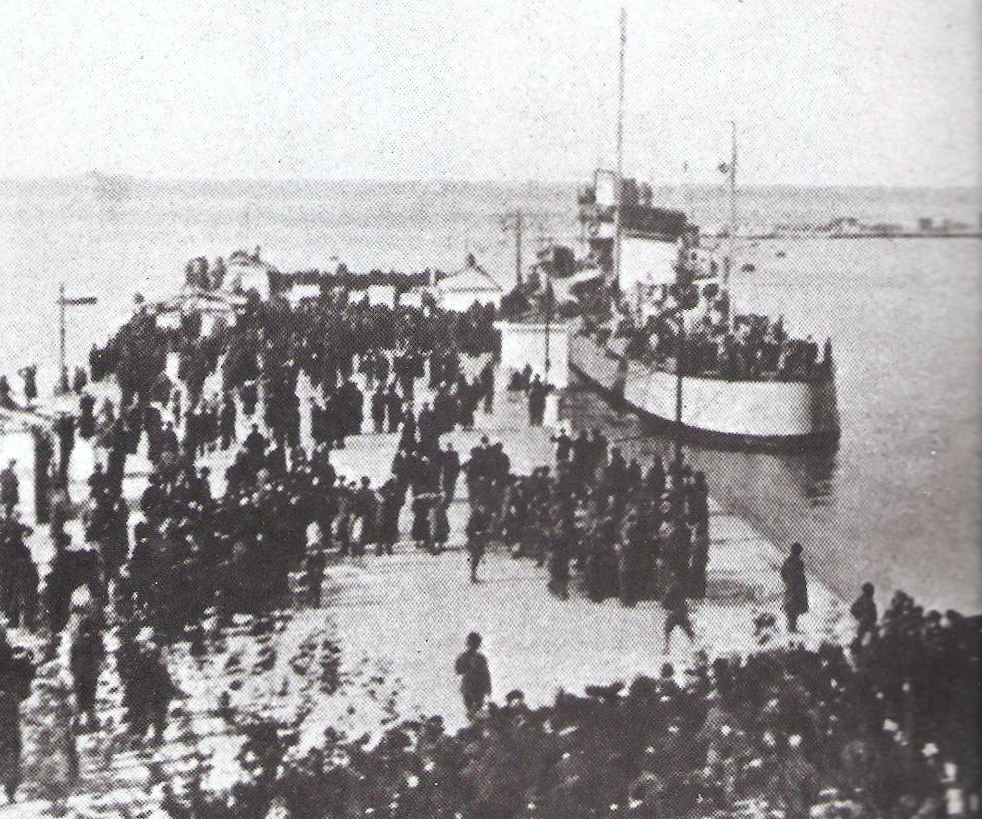
Landing of Italian troops in Trieste on 3 November 1918

When World War I broke out, 128 men of Trieste refused to fight under the Austro-Hungarian flag; immediately after the Italians entered the war against the Central Powers, these men enlisted in the royal army. Among the volunteers who lost their lives during this conflict were the writers and intellectuals Scipio Slataper, Ruggero Timeus and Carlo Stuparich (brother of the more famous Giani). Particularly active with ideas and propaganda were the escapees from Trieste in Italy and France, where they played a major role in founding the Central Committee of Upper Adriatic Propaganda in Rome (1916) and the association Italia irredenta in Paris. All members of the governing bodies of the committee were from Trieste, with the exception of the Dalmatian Alessandro Dudan.

Between 1915 and 1917, Italian aviators bombed Trieste on many occasions, causing many civilian victims. An estimated 50,000 Italian-speaking citizens of the Austrian Littoral fought for Austria-Hungary between 1914 and 1918.

On 3 November 1918, Italian troops entered Trieste, where they were met enthusiastically:

Almost the entire Italian population was in the street awaiting liberators. Italian Army witnesses recall with emotion the enveloping embrace of Trieste, noting even the appearance of a gaunt and subdued crowd, submitted for the whole duration of the war to the same deprivations as Austria's population.

=== Annexation to Italy ===
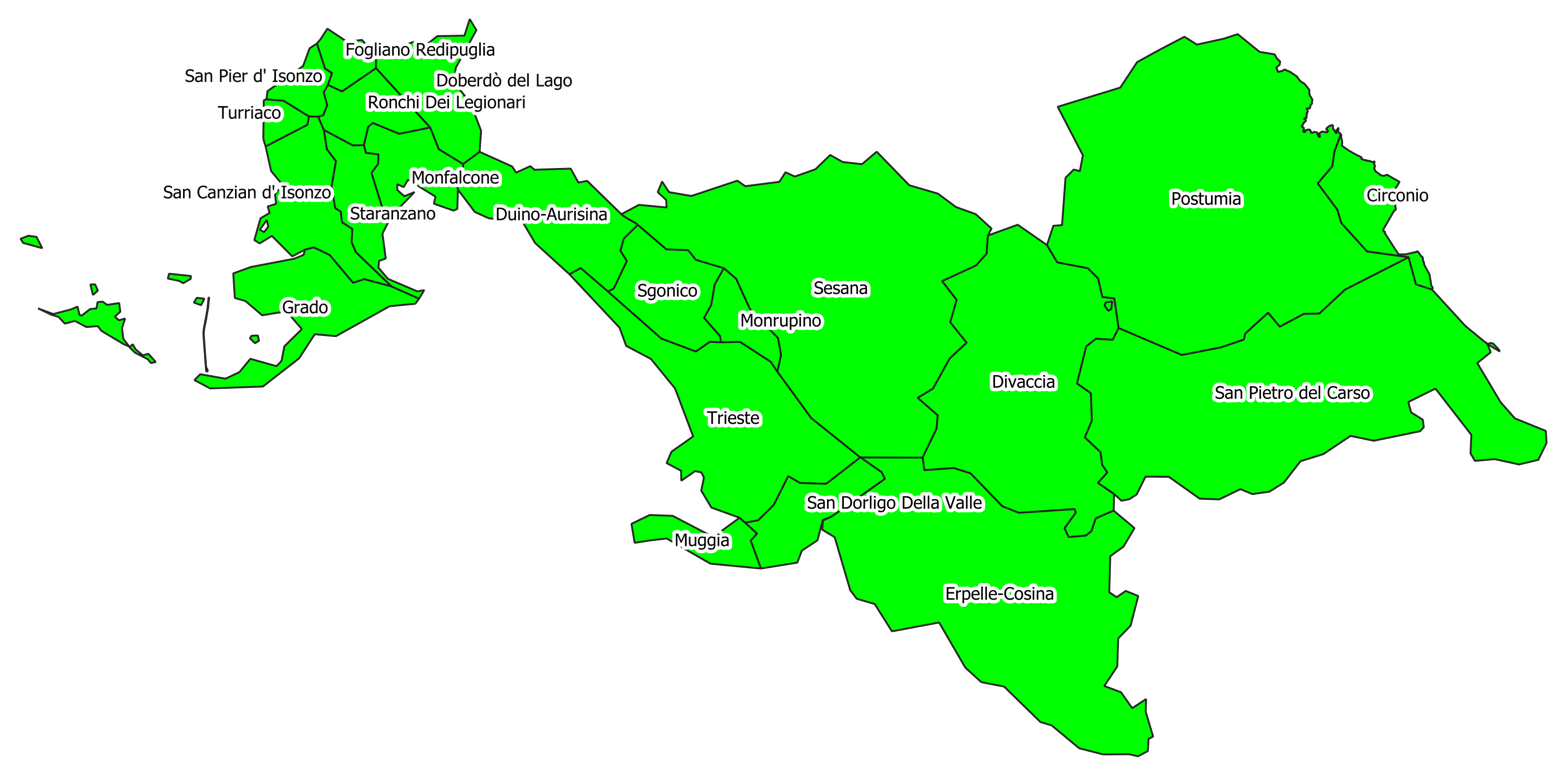
Province of Trieste in the period 1922–1947; the borders do not correspond to those of the period, because they are drawn based on current administrative divisions.

That same November (1918), at the end of World War I, Trieste was occupied by the Royal Italian Army under the command of Carlo Petitti di Roreto. The formal annexation of the city and Venezia Giulia, however, came two years later, between November 1920 and January 1921, when it came into effect with the Treaty of Rapallo. After annexation, the importance of Trieste was somewhat diminished: it became a border city with a more limited hinterland than previously. In addition, the city's port lost the catchment area that had led to its development, consisting of the entire Austro-Hungarian Empire, which had been dissolved following the war. To partially mitigate these difficulties, the Italian state enacted a policy of economic assistance towards the city and its province, initiated by the government of Giovanni Giolitti (1920–1921); this policy lasted throughout the fascist period (1922–1943). The primary effort was to support the industrial sector, which legislators intended to replace the port and related commercial activities as the main drivers of Trieste's economy.

In 1923, Trieste was chosen as the capital of the Italian province of Trieste.

== Fascism ==
Fascism developed early and rapidly in Trieste. In May 1920, the first Squadre volontarie di difesa cittadina, groups of fascist squadristi (Blackshirts), were formed under the command of Ettore Benvenuti. On 11 June, the Arditi (Italian special forces) of an assault regiment waiting for transport to Albania moved through the streets of the city centre, chanting for revolution and using their weapons against officials. The unrest ceased late that night, resulting in two deaths and several injuries. That same June, the Avanguardia studentesca triestina (Triestine student vanguard) was formed, which had similar fascist inspiration. These organizations recruited the squadristi; under the leadership of politician Francesco Giunta, these squadristi burnt down the Hotel Balkan on 13 July 1920 during an anti-Slav demonstration, which was organized by Triestine fascists using the unrest in Split as a pretext. During this unrest, the squadristi set fire to the hotel, showing that "with the flames ... that can be well seen from different points in the city, the force of fascism awaits".

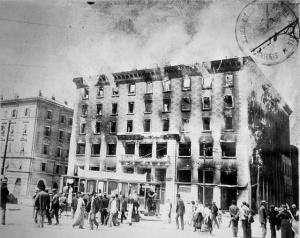
Fire at Narodni dom (Trieste National Hall) on 13 July 1920

In December 1920, the fascist newspaper Il Popolo di Trieste was first published. It began to promote the idea that the collapse of the anachronistic Austro-Hungarian empire would allow the people of Trieste, and the region more generally, to play a more imperialist role in the Adriatic and the Balkans. Different groups were receptive to this message, including industrialists, bourgeois, demobilized officers, students and ambitious citizens. The elections of 1921 gave the fascist Blocco italiano coalition 45% of the total vote. Following the march on Rome on 28 October 1922, the local squadristi, led by Francesco Giunta, occupied a number of public buildings with approval from the authorities; a few days later, fascists paraded through the streets of Trieste.

With the advent of fascism, Trieste and Venezia Giulia began a policy of Italianizing minorities. Starting from the mid-1920s, surnames and toponyms (place names) began to be Italianized. In 1929, the teaching of Slovene and other Slavic languages was banned from all of the cities' public schools; shortly afterwards, all Slovene organizations were dissolved. The objective was the forced assimilation of minority ethnic groups with contempt for their culture and traditions. This policy, combined with the anti-Slav actions of the squadristi, often resulted in deaths and injuries; the policy also had severe repercussions for the delicate relations between ethnic groups. Militant pro-independence Slovene organizations, including TIGR and Borba, reacted to the murders by fascists with similar brutality: acts of armed resistance multiplied with violent actions against members of the fascist regime, law enforcement and, in some cases, ordinary citizens.

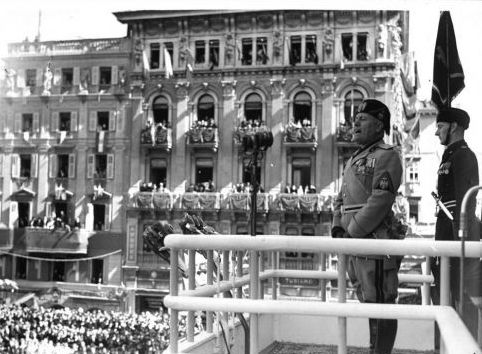
Benito Mussolini giving a speech in Piazza Unità d'Italia in Trieste in September 1938

During the 1930s, two attacks were carried out by TIGR: one at the lighthouse of Faro della Vittoria; and a second, more serious, attack at the headquarters of Il Popolo di Trieste, which caused one death and three injuries. Law enforcement undertook a large investigation, resulting in resistance cells being dismantled. A number of Slovenes were tried by a special session of the Tribunale speciale per la difesa dello Stato (lit. 'Special Tribunal for the Defence of the State'), held in Trieste for the occasion, for crimes including murder, attempted murder and arson. The trial concluded with exemplary sentences: four of the accused (Ferdo Bidovec, Fran Marušič, Zvonimir Miloš and Alojz Valenčič) were sentenced to death and shot at Basovizza on 6 September 1930; another 12 received sentences ranging from 2.5 to 30 years; and two were released.

In December 1941, Trieste held another session of the Tribunale speciale per la difesa dello Stato against nine members of TIGR (both Slovenes and Croats) who were accused of terrorism and espionage. Five members (Pinko Tomažič, Viktor Bobek, Ivan Ivančič, Simon Kos and Ivan Vadnal) were executed at Opicina; the others were imprisoned, bringing an end to the organization.

In June 1940, Italy entered World War II alongside Nazi Germany, which brought problems and loss for Trieste. The Axis invasion of Yugoslavia in spring 1941 reignited Slovene and Croat resistance in Venezia Giulia, especially starting in 1942. The reality of war, particularly the deliberate policies of the occupying German and Italian troops towards the Slovene and Croat populations under their control – burnt villages, decimations (collective reprisal killings), and indiscriminate killing of civilians – along with the opening of concentration camps, strengthened the interethnic hatred that would impact the city and the region well beyond World War II.

From the summer of 1942 until the fall of the Fascist regime on 25 July 1943, the squadristi caused recurring violence in the city. The secretary of the local Fascio (league), the relatively moderate Gustavo Piva, was replaced by the more extreme Giovanni Spangaro, who received unconditional support from the general secretary of the Partito Nazionale Fascista (PNF; transl. National Fascist Party), Aldo Vidussoni. Violence against Slavs and Italian anti-fascists intensified. On 30 June 1942, the Centro per lo studio del problema ebraico (Centre for the study of the Jewish problem) opened in Trieste, based on the similar centre in Rome. On 18 July, Trieste's synagogue was attacked and damaged, after it had been targeted the year before. In the following months, fascists attacked many Jewish and Slavic shops, without major involvement from local citizens, however.

In 1942, the Ispettorato speciale di pubblica sicurezza per la Venezia Giulia (Special inspectorate for public safety for Venezia Giulia) was established. Its headquarters were in a building on Via Bellosguardo that soon became a place where suspected anti-fascists were interrogated, tortured and murdered. This building became known as Villa Triste, the first site to be known as such in Italy.

== German occupation ==
A few days after the Armistice of Cassibile, whose contents were broadcast by radio on 8 September 1943, Trieste was occupied by German troops. Although it was not formally annexed by the Third Reich, the city became part of the Zona d'operazioni del Litorale adriatico (OZAK) (transl. Operational Zone of the Adriatic Littoral). This zone included the provinces of Trieste, Gorizia, Pola, Fiume, Udine, and Ljubljana; it was led by Friedrich Rainer, who nominated Cesare Pagnini as podesta (mayor) of the city, and Bruno Coceani as prefect of the province of Trieste. Both men had the approval of the authorities of the Repubblica Sociale Italiana (RSI; transl. Italian Social Republic) and Italy's dictator Benito Mussolini, who had known Coceani since the 1920s. There were tensions with local fascists, however, who removed themselves from the administration of the town and the province. To avoid division with the Italian authorities, the Germans authorized the local Partito Fascista Repubblicano (PFR; transl. Republican Fascist Party) to assemble its own paramilitary formations and secret police to use in anti-partisan action. Rainer permitted several arrangements in Trieste: the reconstruction of a PFR branch, directed by Bruno Sambo; the presence of a modest contingent of the Italian military, under the command of General Giovanni Esposito of the Guardia Nazionale Repubblicana (GNR; transl. National Republican Guard); and the establishment of a department of the Guardia di Finanza (law enforcement agency).

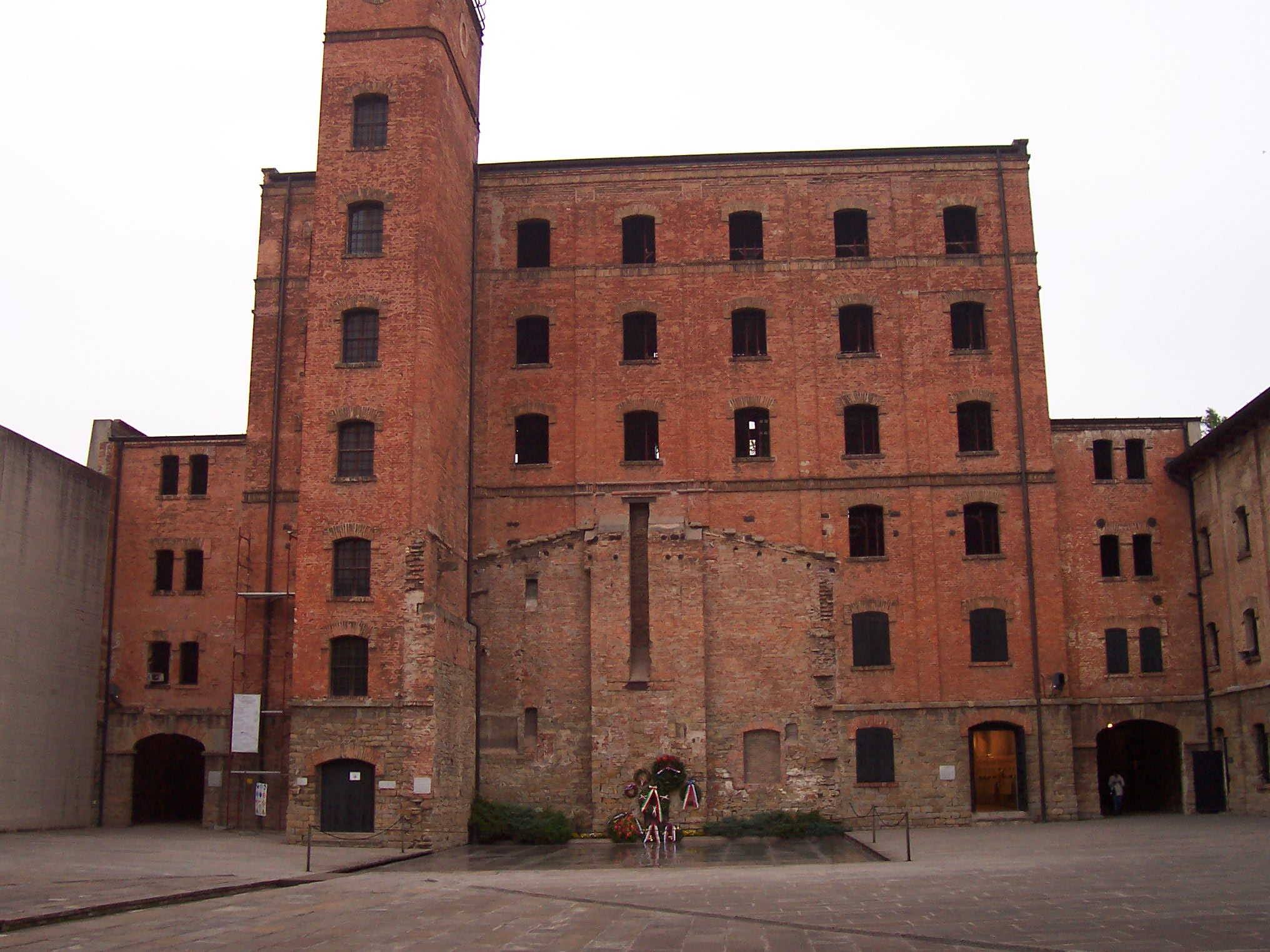
Risiera di San Sabba, an outline of the building housing the crematorium is seen on the front of the building

During the occupation, the Nazis converted the rice hulling facility in San Sabba into a prison camp. It served as a transit camp for Jews being deported to camps in Germany and Poland. In addition, the camp was used to detain, torture and murder prisoners suspected of subversive activities against the regime, as well as Jews considered to be "non-transportable". Estimates from the 1976 trial put the death toll of the camp between 2,000 and 4,000 people, with other estimates as high as 5,000.

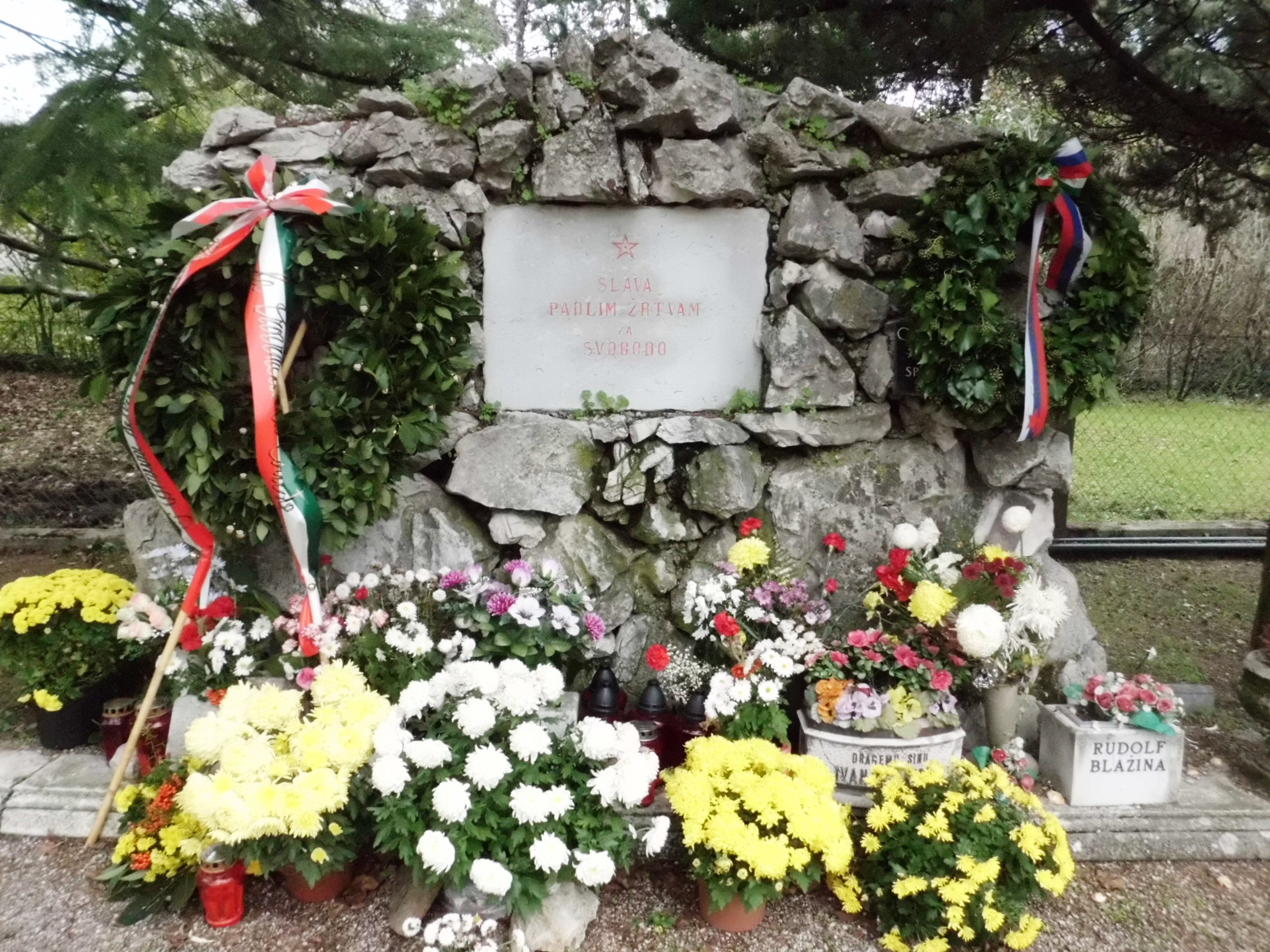
Monument to the 71 hostages shot by the Nazis at Opicina on 3 April 1944 in a reprisal. During the trial for the crimes in the Risiera di San Sabba, it was discovered that the Nazis had used the bodies of the victims to test the crematorium.

During this time, the activities of the Yugoslav partisan movement intensified in the Karst Plateau near Trieste, in order to destabilize the occupying regime.

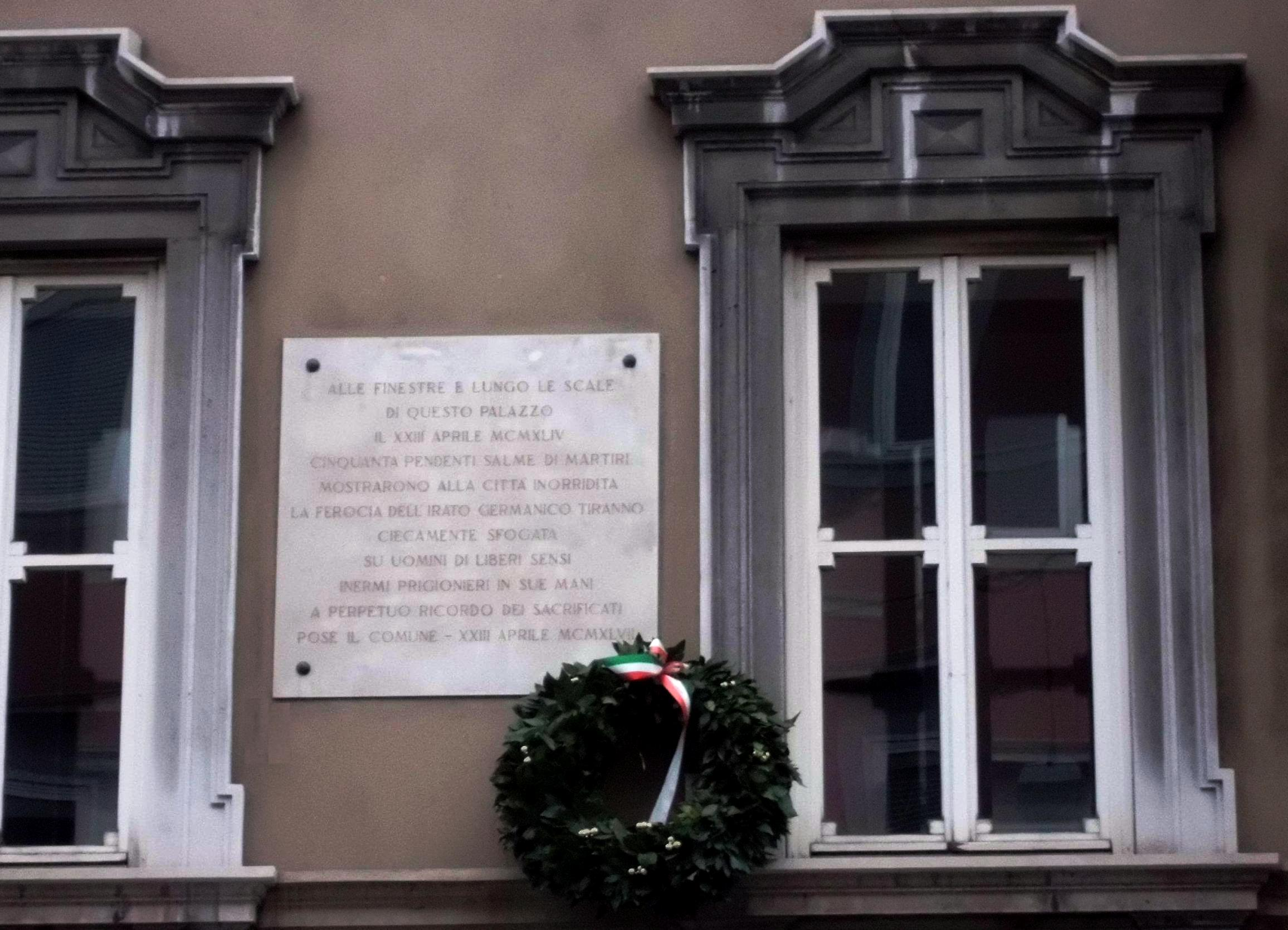
Commemorative plaque on the front of the Palazzo Rittmeyer in via Ghega, to commemorate the 52 hostages hanged as reprisal by the German occupiers on 23 April 1944.

The reaction by the occupiers and their Italian collaborators was immediate: searches and decimations devastated the city and nearby towns. The largest round-up operation occurred on 27 February 1944: during this operation, the occupiers took 670 men aged 15–65 from nearby Slovene villages and deported them to Bavaria for forced labour in factories and farms.

In April 1944, in response to a partisan attack that caused the death of seven German soldiers in Opicina, 71 civilians of both Italian and Slovene ethnicity were shot in an act of reprisal. A few days later, on 23 April 1944, another attack led to another reprisal, resulting in the death by hanging of 52 people in Palazzo Rittmayer in via Ghega.

Between April 1944 and February 1945, Trieste was subject to bombing raids by British and American forces. The resulting damage included port structures, the oil refinery and shipyards, and the city itself. Many residential buildings were destroyed, and many others were damaged. The number of bombing victims is estimated at 1,000 for the comune; the raid of 10 June 1944 was particularly devastating, causing the deaths of approximately 400 people.

== Liberation and Yugoslav occupation ==
=== Liberation of Trieste ===
On 30 April 1945, Trieste's National Liberation Committee (CLN), under the command of Antonio Fonda Savio, began to liberate the city. Joining the CLN in its attacks against German forces were the Guardia di Finanza and many elements of the Guardia Civica (a civic self-defence force), which had been secretly organized by the committee; the suburbs and the districts saw action from communist groups. Slovene partisan groups did not participate in violent actions in the city centre, and instead they were active in the Karst Plateau and the outer districts.

The 4th Army of the Yugoslav National Liberation Army – allied with Anglo-American forces, the Slovene IX Korpus (a military unit also containing people from Trieste), and partisan forces already in the city – liberated Trieste from Nazi occupation on the night of 30 April to 1 May 1945.

=== Yugoslav occupation ===
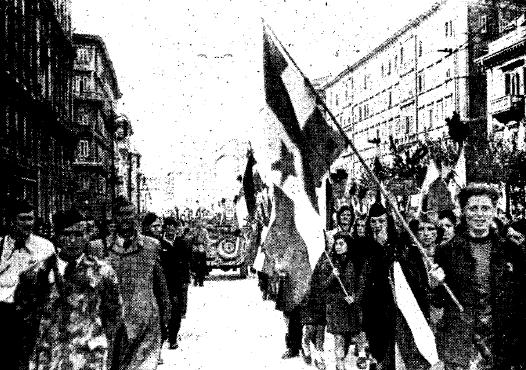
The Yugoslav National Liberation Army entering Trieste (1 May 1945)

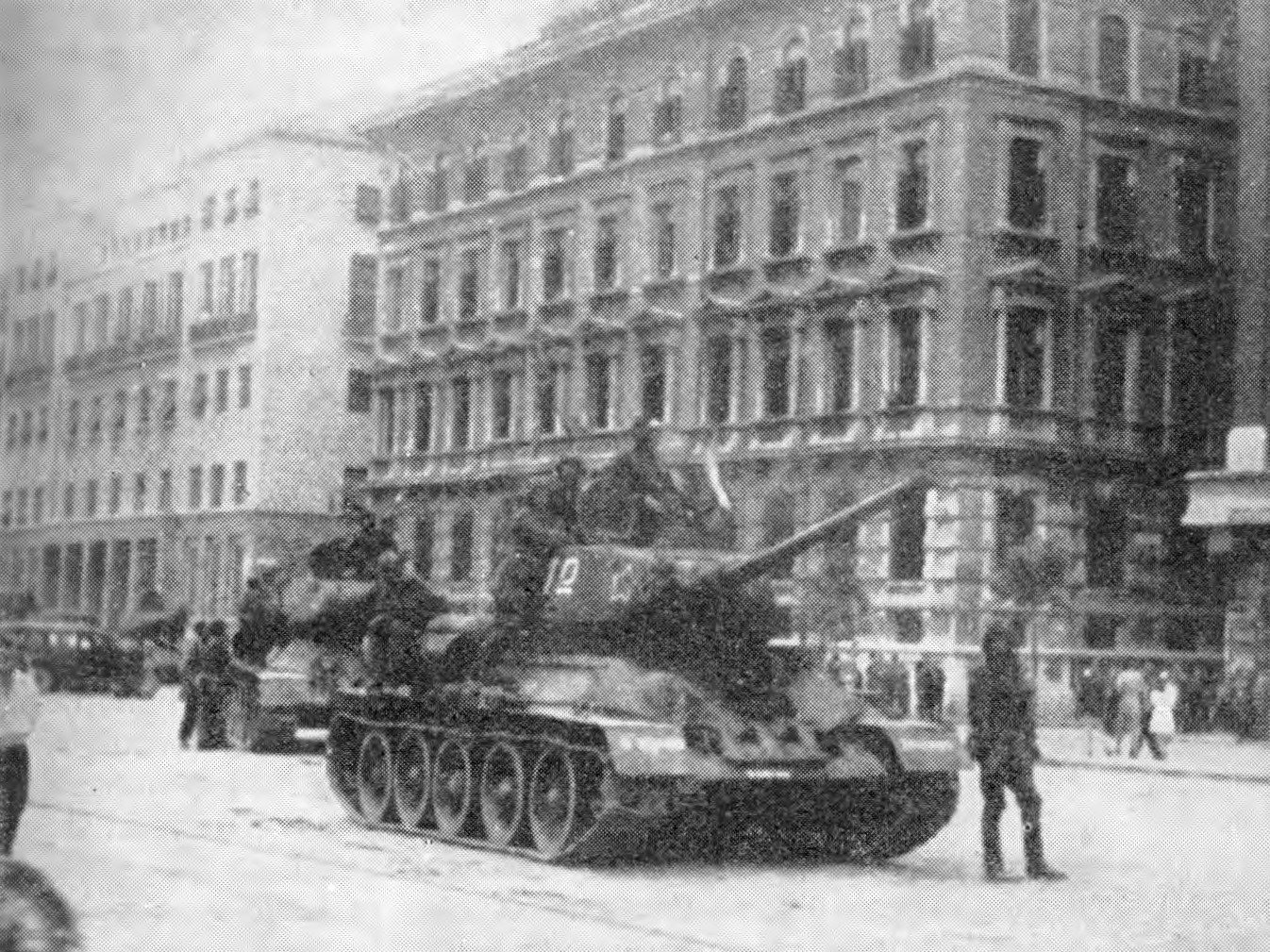
T-34 tanks of the 4th Army of the Yugoslav National Liberation Army entering Trieste.

On the morning of 1 May, the vanguard of the Yugoslav partisan forces reached Trieste, followed by the IX Korpus of the Yugoslav army, both under the command of Josip Broz Tito – who was absent from the theatre of operations.

The Yugoslav 4th Army and the Italian insurgents met in the city centre around 9:30 am – a forward group under the command of Božo Mandac against Ercole Miani, commander of the local partisans, alongside other representatives of the CLN. The Yugoslav forces intended to attack the last remaining positions held by the Germans; however, a few hours later, rather than using the support promised to them by Italian partisans of the CLN, the Yugoslav forces demanded the surrender of the Axis forces. Some Italian units refused, resulting in fights against Yugoslav forces in Roiano and Rozzol. On the afternoon of 2 May, the 2nd New Zealand Division arrived under the command of General Bernard Freyberg, prompting the last remaining German forces to surrender.

The Yugoslav troops began a 43-day occupation of Trieste. In early May, Tito nominated Franc Štoka, a member of the Communist Party, as political commissar for the city. Štoka declared the city to be part of the future Federal Republic of Yugoslavia. The flag of Yugoslavia was to be flown next to the Italian flag on public buildings, and the time zone was changed to that of Slovenia. Many members of the CLN were forced to go into hiding, fearing reprisal, while others secretly left the city. The curfew lasted until the end of May, even though the war had been over for several weeks.

On the 5th day of Yugoslav occupation, a crowd of people descended into city squares to demonstrate for returning Trieste to Italy. The demonstration was organized by the CLN, which aimed to create a united democratic front that would petition the Allies to compel Tito's forces to leave the city. Yugoslav forces opened fire on the demonstrators, killing five people. Freyberg's New Zealand troops moved from the neighbourhoods and the port that they had occupied, avoiding confrontation with Yugoslav forces. The occupation ended on 12 June 1945, following agreement on the Morgan Line dividing the region: some areas would be administered by Yugoslav forces, and other areas would be administered by British and United States troops. The occupation was seen as a moment of liberation by the Slovene community of Trieste, while the Italian population saw the occupation as another period of loss and oppression.

=== Foibe massacres and exiles in Trieste ===
Starting in September 1943, as a result of the rapid collapse of the Italian Army following the Armistice of Cassibile, Slav partisan groups took control of large amounts of territory in the region. In Istria and the Karst Plateau near Trieste, these groups began a campaign of killing suspected fascists, as well as those who opposed the communist politics and territorial ambitions of Tito in Venezia Giulia. Those killed were mainly Italians, but also Slovenes and Croats. Killings increased during the following years and reached a peak with the entrance of the Yugoslav army into the city; the control that this army could exercise over the territory went unchallenged by Freyberg's New Zealand troops. During the period of Yugoslav occupation, the Yugoslav authorities searched and arrested many citizens suspected of opposing communist ideology or deemed to be untrustworthy because of their social position, or their family or national origins. Among these citizens were mainly fascists and collaborationists, but also fighters in the Italian liberation war, ordinary workers and victims of personal feuds. The majority of those arrested did not return home. The people of Trieste called for intervention by the Allies, who made formal complaints without achieving noticeable results. General Gentry, who shared command of the Allied troops with Freyberg, met with his Yugoslav counterpart and stated that the Allies could not allow summary arrests and the removal of citizens without due process. However, this meeting achieved nothing.

The discovery of the first foibe (massacre) in autumn 1943, as well as the testimony of refugees from Dalmatia on the fate of Italians in the city of Zara in November 1944, left little doubt in citizens' minds about the treatment of people who were arrested. Shortly after the withdrawal of Yugoslav troops from Trieste, a series of excavations began in the Karst Plateau. Eventually, a number of foibe were found near the city: the primary foibe were in Basovizza, Monrupino and Sežana (currently in the territory of Slovenia); the secondary sites were in Opicina, Campagna and Corgnale, with an undetermined number of bodies. Not all the disappeared were thrown into the foibe: an unknown number were deported to other parts of Venezia Giulia or Yugoslavia, and they were likely killed and buried there. In April 1947, the Allied military government collected the names of 1,492 people disappeared from Trieste, based on reports from family members; however, these numbers were not definitive, and definitive numbers were never provided even decades later. When Vittorio Vidali, one of the region's communist leaders, returned to Trieste in March 1947, he noted the fracture between Stalin – supported by the Partito Comunista Italiano (PCI; transl. Italian Communist Party) – and Tito. Vidali referred to Tito's supporters as "a gang of assassins and spies".

As of the summer of 1945, the main Istrian–Dalmatian exodus was already underway, with people leaving areas that had been occupied by Yugoslav forces and would later be annexed to the Yugoslav state. The exodus had started in 1943 and would last for about 15 years; there were an estimated 250,000 or more exiles, with Trieste as one of their main destinations. The city welcomed some 65,000 exiles who chose to build a new life in the area that would eventually become the autonomous region of Friuli-Venezia Giulia. This influx of people was a significant asset for the city's economic and demographic development, reversing a long period of demographic stagnation starting in the 1920s.

== Allied occupation and the Free Territory of Trieste ==
With the Belgrade Accords of 9 June 1945 and the withdrawal of Yugoslav troops from Trieste on 12 June, all of Venezia Giulia was divided into two zones along the Morgan Line. Zone A, containing Trieste, would be administered by the English and Americans, while Zone B would be administered by the Yugoslavs. Following the Paris Peace Treaties in 1947, Gorizia, Monfalcone and other small areas of Venezia Giulia were assigned to Italy; Istria and the rest of Venezia Giulia were assigned to Yugoslavia. Parts of Zone A, including Trieste, and Zone B, north of the Quieto river, remained unassigned.

Trieste was provisionally designated as the British United States Zone – Free Territory of Trieste (BUSZ-FTT; Territorio Libero di Trieste, Zona Anglo – Americana). From September 1947 onward, this territory was administered by the United Nations (UN) and the Allied Military Government - Free Territory of Trieste (AMG-FTT; Territorio Libero di Trieste). Zone B was administered by Yugoslavia. The UN planned for the Free Territory of Trieste, including both zones, to have a seat at the UN.

On 8 October 1953, the ambassadors of the United States and the United Kingdom in Rome made an official declaration: they informed the Italian and the Yugoslav governments that their countries intended to end their military occupation of Zone A, which would then have passed to Italian administration. In a secret statement communicated only to Italy, the US and the UK ambassadors also stated that this declaration was a definitive settlement; furthermore, they stated that their countries would have opposed any military attempt by Yugoslavia to take Zone A, but not to annex Zone B. Yugoslavia condemned this partition, and both Italy and Yugoslavia sent troops to their borders, resulting in some 50,000 troops facing each other. However, because of opposition by the Soviet Union, the US and UK could not intervene.

Shortly after the declaration of 8 October, several demonstrations took place both for and against the return of Trieste to Italy. The first demonstration was by about 2000 Slovene students who protested in the city centre; young Italians responded by breaking into the offices of the Yugoslav economic delegation, breaking the windows and throwing the furniture into the street. Tensions peaked with the Trieste riots during early November. On 4 November, the city celebrated Italy's victory in World War I; many people went to pay their respects to the fallen at the Sacrario militare di Redipuglia (transl. Redipuglia War Memorial), passing the border checkpoint at Duino and entering Italian territory. When they returned to Yugoslavia that evening, the first demonstrations started; on the morning of 5 November, Trieste's mayor flew the Italian flag from the city hall in place of the flag of Trieste. The Italian tricolour was lowered some hours later by the British; this led to protesters gathering around the police headquarters, where shots were fired, resulting in the deaths of two demonstrators.

A general strike occurred the next day, when the population of Trieste gathered in Piazza Unità to demonstrate against the Allied military government. Police agents in the government building fired into the crowd, killing another four demonstrators; the situation became uncontrollable, and riots broke out. American troops intervened and were able to calm the crowd. The authorities of the city protested against these actions, and they demanded that the Allied military government hand over the British troops and police officers who were responsible.

== Return to Italy ==
=== The London Memorandum ===
In December 1953, a high-level meeting began to resolve the Trieste question. Tito had made it clear that any solution altering the status quo while disadvantaging Yugoslavia would not have been accepted, while the Italians wanted to retain the conditions in the declaration of 8 October. The Yugoslav position softened after the British and the Americans promised to contribute US$20 million and £2 million to finance a port in Zone B. The Italian position also softened because of a more realistic approach by Prime Minister Scelba and his foreign minister Piccioni.

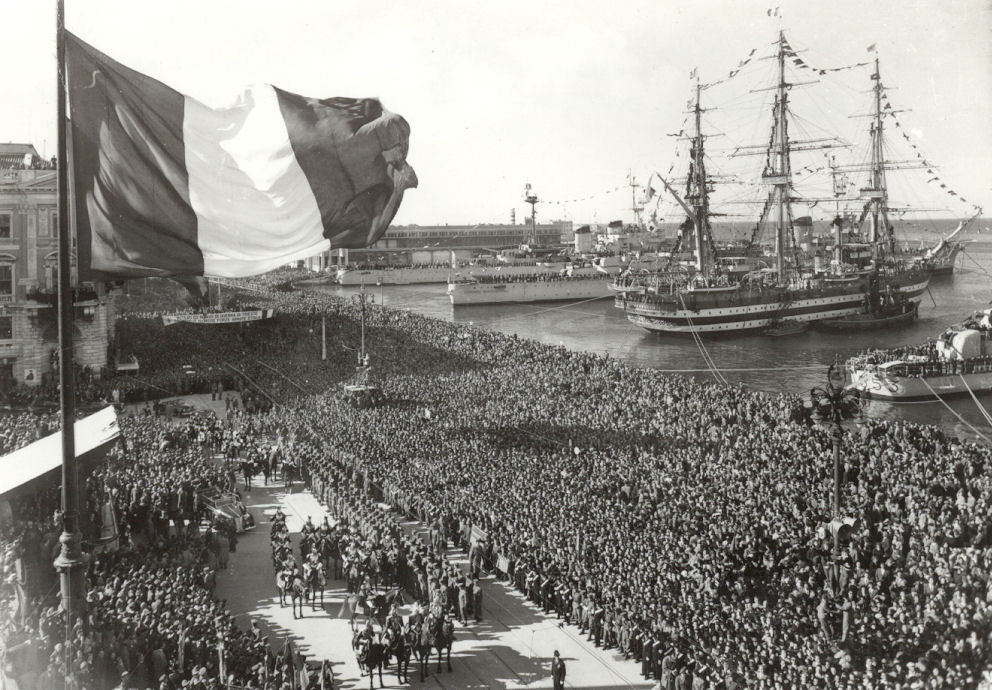
Visit by President Einaudi following the return of Trieste to Italy (4 November 1954)

On 5 October 1954, an agreement was signed in London by the representatives of the United States, the United Kingdom, Italy and Yugoslavia; this agreement became known as the London Memorandum. The agreement split the Free Territory of Trieste into the two previously assigned zones, with some tweaks in Yugoslavia's favour at the border in the comune of Muggia. That afternoon, the British major general John Winterton announced the agreement by radio, and a celebratory crowd gathered in Piazza Unità d'Italia. Three weeks later, on 26 October 1954, Italian troops entered the city.

Trieste lost a large part of its province and was left on a narrow strip of land, which reduced its economic potential. It was decided to maintain the city's status as a free-trade zone, and protections for ethnic minorities were guaranteed in both zones.

=== Capital of Friuli-Venezia Giulia ===
On returning to Italian administration, the Christian Democrat governments of the time worked to give the city tools to help its economic development. In 1955, a Fondo di rotazione (public fund) was created to provide subsidized loans to entrepreneurs in the provinces of Trieste and Gorizia, and three years later a law was passed to build new infrastructure and enlarge the port. In 1963, Friuli-Venezia Giulia received the status of an autonomous region, and Trieste was chosen as its capital, creating a number of jobs tied to public administration. The founding of Italcantieri, headquartered in Trieste from 1966, also helped to keep a high level of employment.

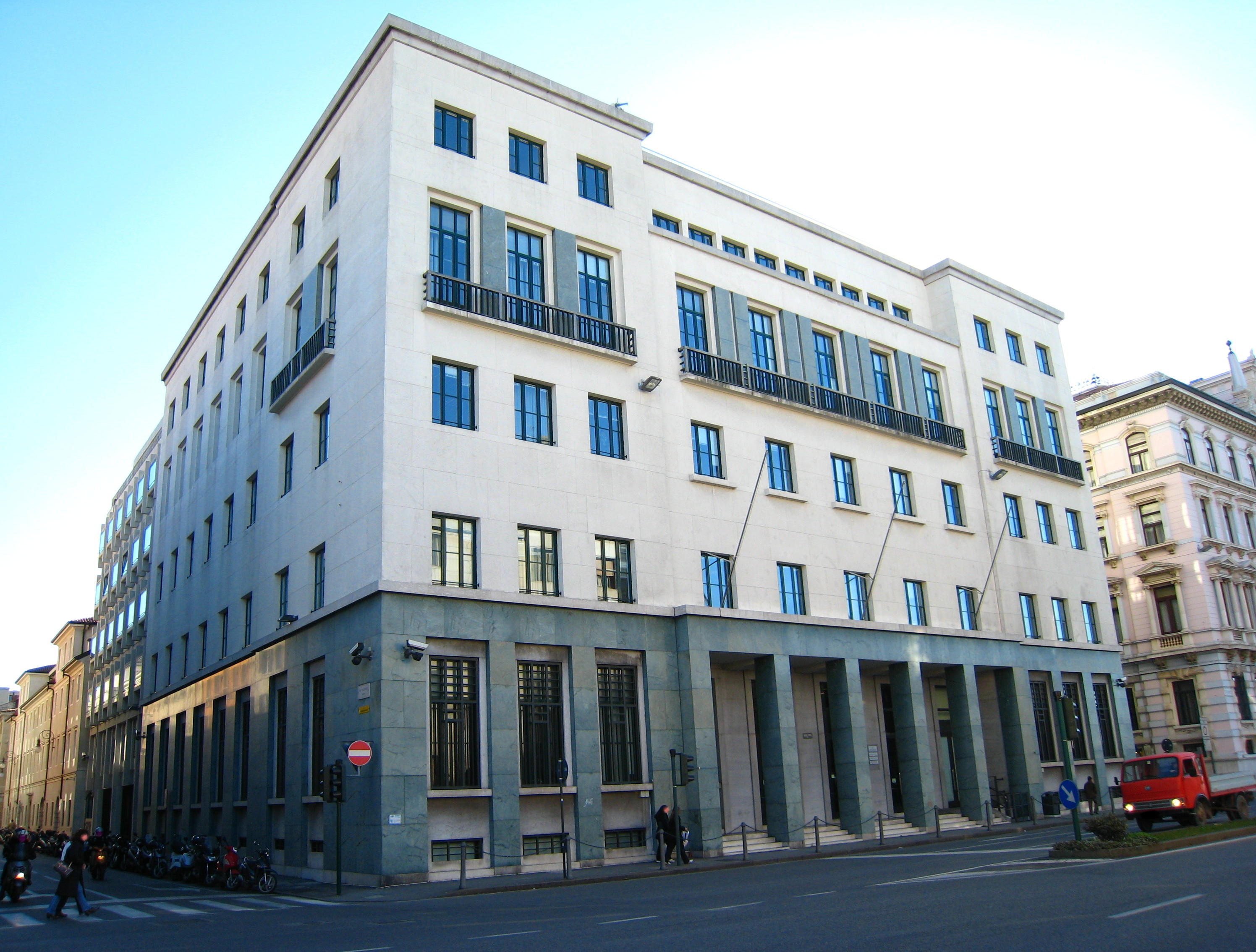
Former headquarters of Italcantieri in Trieste

These legislative actions were not able to stop the decline of Trieste's shipbuilding industry, its port and the territory's industry, even during the economic miracle. Some factors that contributed to its decline included its remote location, competition from Yugoslav ports (particularly Fiume), its limited hinterland, and the nature of the state contributions. At the end of the 1960s, the port in Trieste was second only to that of Genoa in terms of volume of goods, but 80% of what passed through Trieste's port was oil, whose transportation produced only modest profits compared to other goods. Between the 1960s and 1970s, cross-border trade began to develop; however, this was generally done by small businesses that were unable to absorb the large number of people who could not find work in the struggling industries.

=== Treaty of Osimo ===
Starting in the early 1970s, meetings began between the Italian and Yugoslav governments, attempting to amicably resolve open problems between the two countries, including mutual recognition of their de facto border. Beginning in February 1971, the Italian foreign minister Aldo Moro met with his Yugoslavian counterpart, Mirko Tepavac; this meeting was followed by an official visit by Tito; a meeting between Tito and Italian foreign minister Giuseppe Medici; another meeting between Tito and the director general of the Italian industry ministry Eugenio Carbone; and finally a meeting between Tito and Italian politician Enrico Berlinguer. The Treaty of Osimo was signed on 10 November 1975, with support from the United States, which was trying to build closer relations with non-aligned Yugoslavia to strengthen the anti-Soviet bloc.

The treaty included the following points:

- Official recognition of the de facto border between the two countries since 1954
- Reaffirmation of the protections for ethnic minorities previously stated in the London Memorandum
- Construction of an industrial zone on the border between Slovenia and Italy, which would have extended into the comune of Trieste
- Construction of infrastructure (roads, motorways, etc.) between Gorizia and the neighbouring Slovene territory

The signing of the treaty prompted protests from the people of Trieste, who had not been consulted at any point during the process. Of particular concern was the definitive renunciation of historical Venetian lands, even though most of the Italian population who had lived there had departed by that time. Moderates and conservatives rejected the creation of an industrial zone that they felt would have contributed to the city's de-Italianization; left-wing voices raised similar concerns, as well as noting the effect that such a zone would have on the local ecosystem.

This situation prompted the formation of the Lista per Trieste (LpT; transl. List for Trieste) political party, led by Manilo Cecovini; its electoral program was to create an enlarged free zone including the entire province of Trieste. This party obtained some electoral success between 1978 and 1983, surpassing the national parties and gaining between 20% and 33% of the vote. In 1987, with the support of the Partito Socialista Italiano (PSI; transl. Italian Socialist Party), Giulio Camber was elected to the Chamber of Deputies (the lower house of the Italian Parliament). During the following decade, LpT was a diminishing force and repeatedly supported Forza Italia (a former Italian political party). LpT never obtained the desired enlarged free zone, but it could definitively block construction of an industrial zone. Yugoslavia did not try to impose the terms of the treaty after its ratification in 1977. Only some proposed infrastructure projects in the province of Gorizia were completed.

== Trieste in the European Union ==
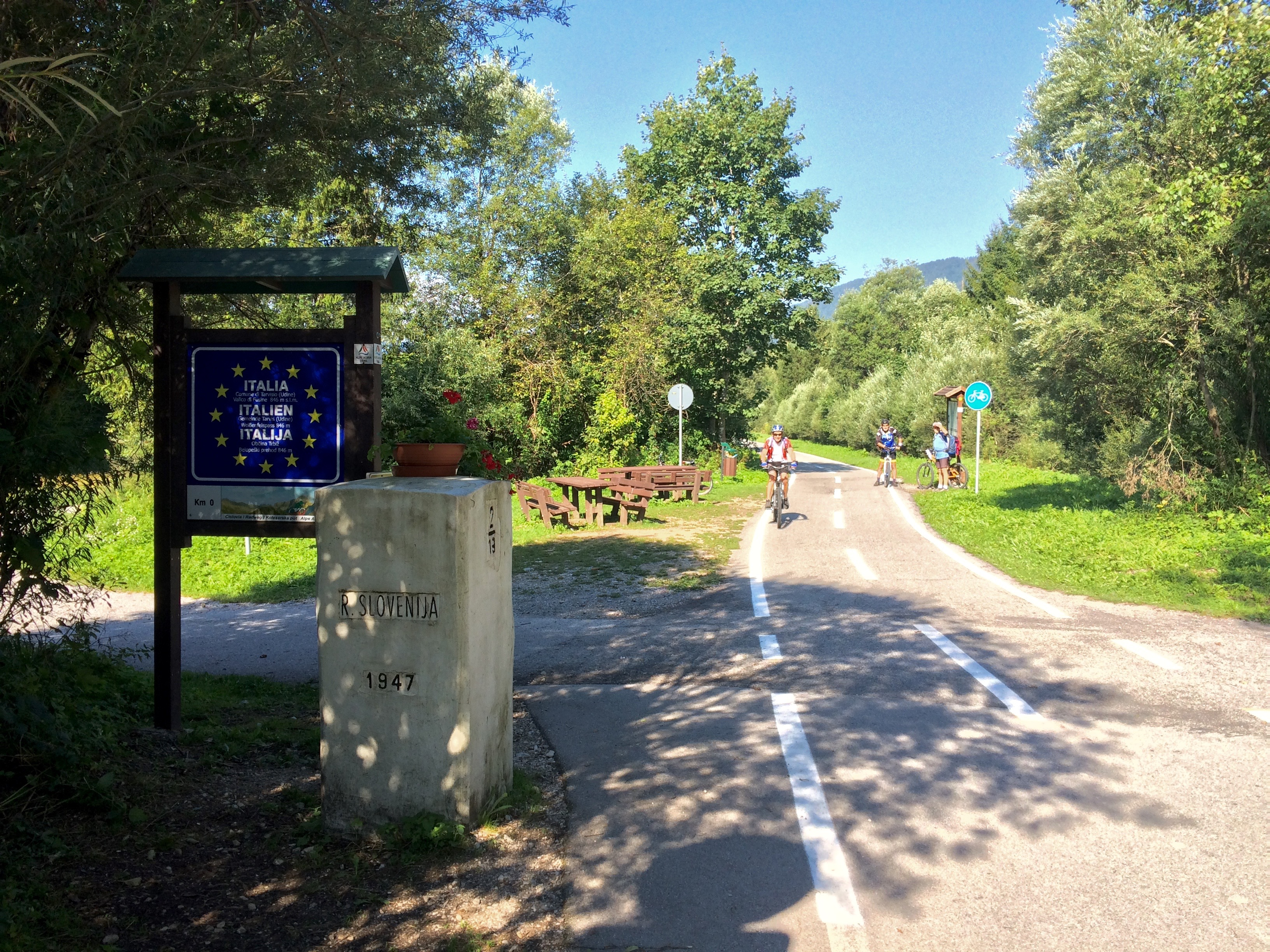
Border between Italy and Slovenia in 2015

Slovenia's accession to the European Union in 2004 and to the Schengen Area in December 2007 allowed Trieste to emerge from its isolation. Since then, the border between Italy and Slovenia has ceased to be a barrier to the free passage of people and goods.

== See also ==
- Timeline of Trieste
