= Foiba di Basovizza =

Artificial cavity in Friuli-Venezia Giulia, Italy, site of a civilian attack

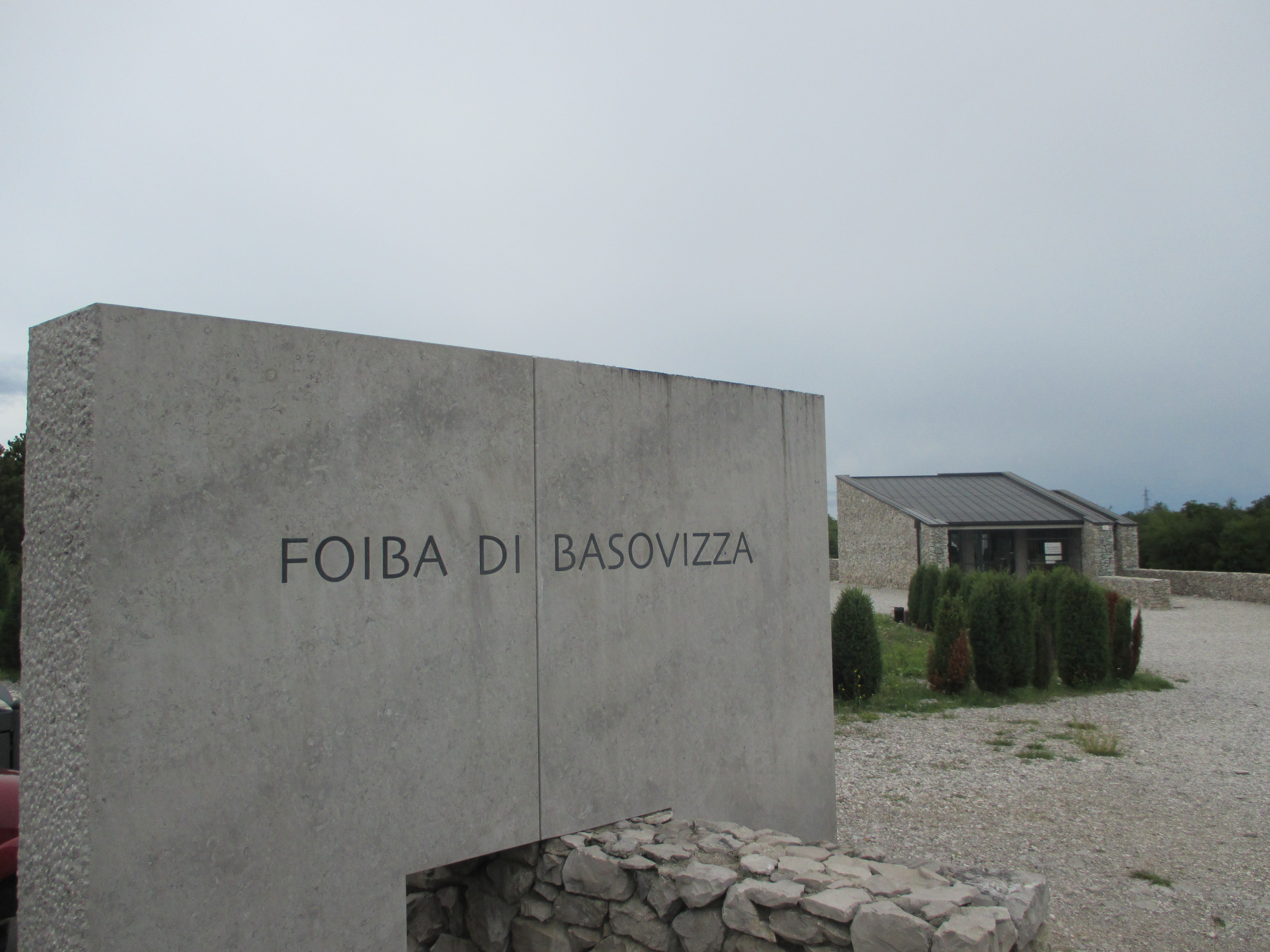
- Location: 45°38′03.4″N 13°51′51.0″E; Basovizza, Friuli-Venezia Giulia Italy
- Date: May 1945

The foiba di Basovizza is an artificial cavity located near Basovizza, in the comune of Trieste in the north-eastern Karst plateau at an altitude of 377 meters. It is not a true foiba as it was dug at the beginning of the 20th century for coal extraction and later abandoned due to lack of productivity. It is more than 200 meters deep and about 4 meters wide. Towards the end of World War Two, communist Yugoslav partisans used it a place for summary executions of prisoners, soldiers, police officers and civilians. A monument was erected at the site to commemorate the victims of the massacres in the area. In 1992 the place was declared a national monument by President Oscar Luigi Scalfaro.

== The pit ==
It was thought at the beginning of the 19th century that large deposits of coal or lignite could be found on the highlands around Trieste, Between 1901 and 1908 the Bohemian company Škoda Works started exploring a pre-existing mineshaft near the frazione of Basovizza, however the excavations were unfruitful and the mine was abandoned. The vertical depth was about 256 meters, and at the bottom a 2 meter high and 735 meter long tunnel opened up. Between 1936 and 1943 a number of descents were carried out: in 1936 the Arsa Corporation employed a group of speleologists from Trieste to descend into the shaft, reaching a maximum depth of 225 meters before been blocked by approximately 30 meters of detritus. In 1939 a team from the Italian Alpine Club lowered themselves to a depth of 226 meters to recover the body of an inhabitant of Basovizza who had fallen in. In 1941 an alpinist lowered himself to recover the body if a girl, again at a depth of 226 meters. On 2 April 1943 a group of seven speleologists lowered themselves to a depth of 220 meters.

== The Foibe Massacres ==
In May 1945 the mineshaft was used by Yugoslav partisans for the disposal of an unknown number of bodies of Italians and Germans during the Yugoslav occupation of Trieste. The bodies of a number of prisoners, soldiers and civilians massacred by the army and the OZNA were disposed of in the mineshaft.

Documentation collected by the Anglo-American allies is based on the testimonies of the parish priests Francesco Malalan of Sant'Antonio in Bosco, and Virgil Šček Corgnale. The testimonies told of short trials held by the Yugoslav IV army against several hundred victims: prisoners, soldiers, police officers and civilians (including a number of Germans), followed by shootings with the bodies then disposed of in the pit, along with various debris of the recent battles, including explosives.

Attempts were made, supported by the Anglo-Americans, at recovering some of the bodies in the summer of 1945 using heavy equipment, this provoked strong resentment as the expectation was that the bodied would be handled carefully to permit identification. The search was suspended to await for more appropriate equipment, but never resumed.

In 1948 an investigation discovered that that depth of the pit had been reduced to 192m, estimates were made of the number of bodies required to fill that volume resulting in an inflated number of up to 1500 victims this flawed estimate was however boosted by the volatile political and media environment of the time and is still widely repeated today.

The presence of explosives, as well as later use of the pit to dispose of other waste, made the exhumation of the bodies impossible and the pit was sealed, and a precise number of victims is not known.

== Current status ==
On 22 February 1980 the Ministero dei Beni Culturali declared the site to be of historical interest due to the tragic events that happened there.

On 3 November 1991 the site was visited by President Francesco Cossiga, with his successor Oscar Luigi Scalfaro visiting on 11 February 1993. Scalfaro declared the side a national monument by a decree dated 11 September 1992.

10 February 2007 saw the inauguration of the Memorial at the Foiba di Basovizza and the nearby documentation centre maintained by Lega Nazionale. The work was realized by architect Ennio Cervi, with the collaboration of artist Livio Schiozzi.

The foiba of Basovizza has become the emblematic symbol of the Foibe massacres and is today often the site of memorial services.

== Bibliography ==
- AA. VV., Foiba di Basovizza : monumento nazionale. Comune di Trieste, Assessorato alla Cultura: Civici Musei di storia ed arte; Lega Nazionale, Comune di Trieste editore, Trieste, 2008. ISBN 978-88-87377-29-3.
- AA. VV., Istria nel tempo: manuale di storia regionale dell'Istria con riferimenti alla città di Fiume, Centro di ricerche storiche di Rovigno, 2006.
- Gianni Oliva, Foibe. Le stragi negate degli italiani della Venezia Giulia e dell'Istria, Mondadori, Milano 2003, ISBN 88-04-48978-2.
- Pierluigi Pallante, La tragedia delle foibe, Editori Riuniti, Roma 2006.
- Arrigo Petacco, L'esodo. La tragedia negata degli italiani d'Istria, Dalmazia e Venezia Giulia, Mondadori, Milano 1999.
- Raoul Pupo (2005). Il lungo esodo. Istria: le persecuzioni, le foibe, l'esilio. Milano: Rizzoli. ISBN 88-17-00562-2.
- Raoul Pupo (2010). Trieste '45. Bari-Roma: Laterza. ISBN 978-88-420-9263-6.
- Raoul Pupo, Roberto Spazzali (2003). Foibe. Bruno Mondadori. ISBN 88-424-9015-6.
- Guido Rumici, Infoibati. I nomi, i luoghi, i testimoni, i documenti, Mursia, Milano 2002, ISBN 978-88-425-2999-6.
- Fulvio Salimbeni, Le foibe, un problema storico, Unione degli istriani, Trieste 1998.
- Roberto Spazzali, Foibe: un dibattito ancora aperto. Tesi politica e storiografica giuliana tra scontro e confronto, Lega Nazionale, Trieste 1990.
- Roberto Spazzali, Tragedia delle foibe: contributo alla verità, Grafica goriziana, Gorizia 1993.
- Giampaolo Valdevit (cur.), Foibe, il peso del passato. Venezia Giulia 1943-1945, Istituto regionale per la storia del Movimento di liberazione nel Friuli-Venezia Giulia, Trieste 1997.
