= Arco di Riccardo =

Roman arch in Trieste, Italy

Coordinates: 45°38′52″N 13°46′08″E

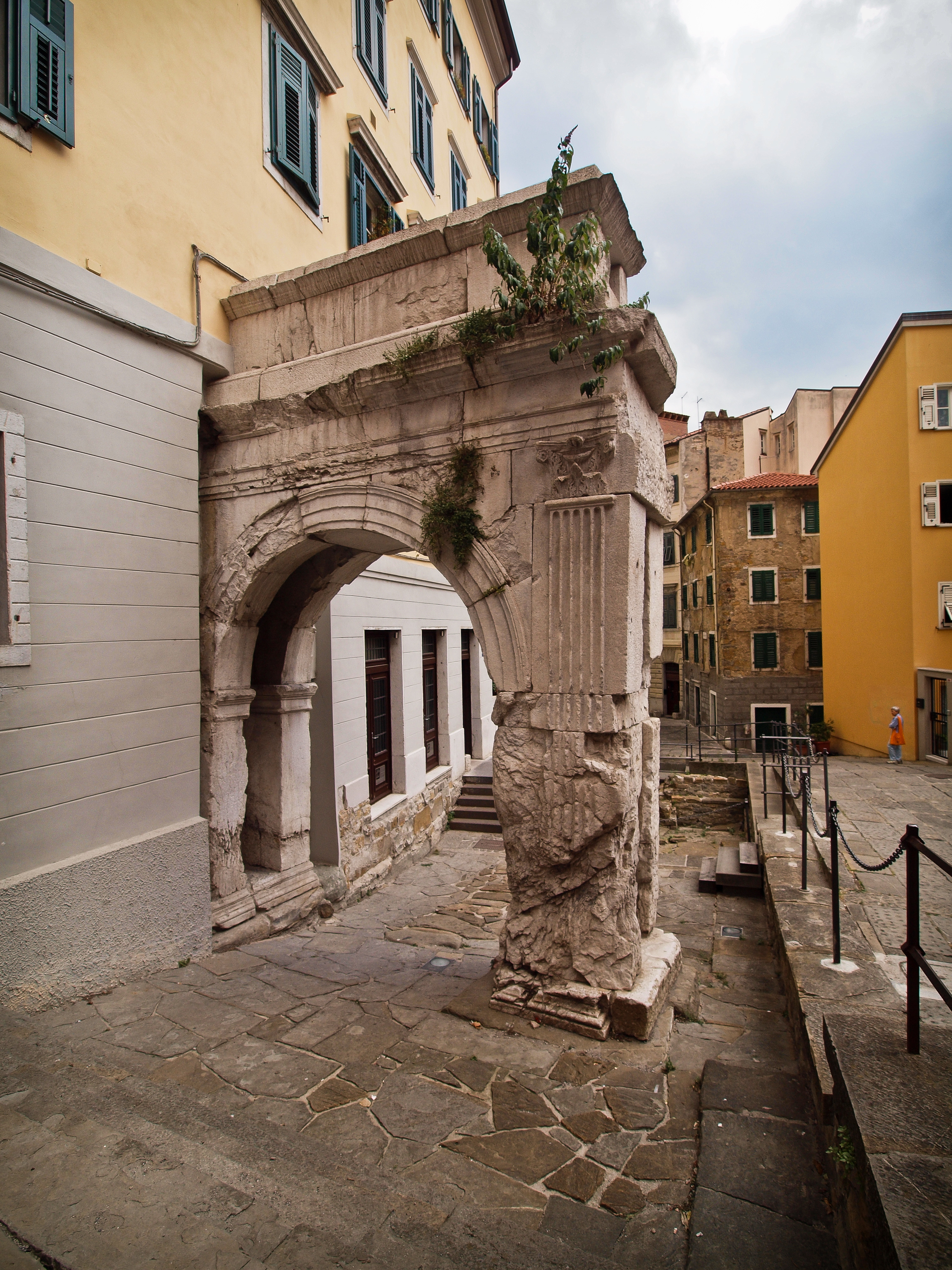

The Arco di Riccardo (literally, "Richard's Arch") is a Roman triumphal arch in Trieste, Italy. The 7.2 metre arch is the only remaining part of the city's Roman walls, constructed from 33–32 BC.

Folk etymology credits the arch's name to Richard the Lionheart (Italian: Riccardo Cuor di Leone), the Crusader king of England, who is known to have been in the vicinity in the early 1190s. However, there is more evidence that its current name is a corruption of Arco del Cardo ("Arch of the Cardo"), with a cardo being the main north-to-south route in Roman cities. Another hypothesis is that the name is corrupted from Arco del Ricario, with Ricario being a nearby medieval courthouse.

Throughout the Middle Ages, the arch remained mostly visible, though sometimes incorporated into buildings. Its western side was fully excavated in 1913, though the eastern one remains incorporated into a modern building.
