= Rozzol =

Neighbourhood in Trieste, Italy

Rozzol Rocol - Melara (Slovene)
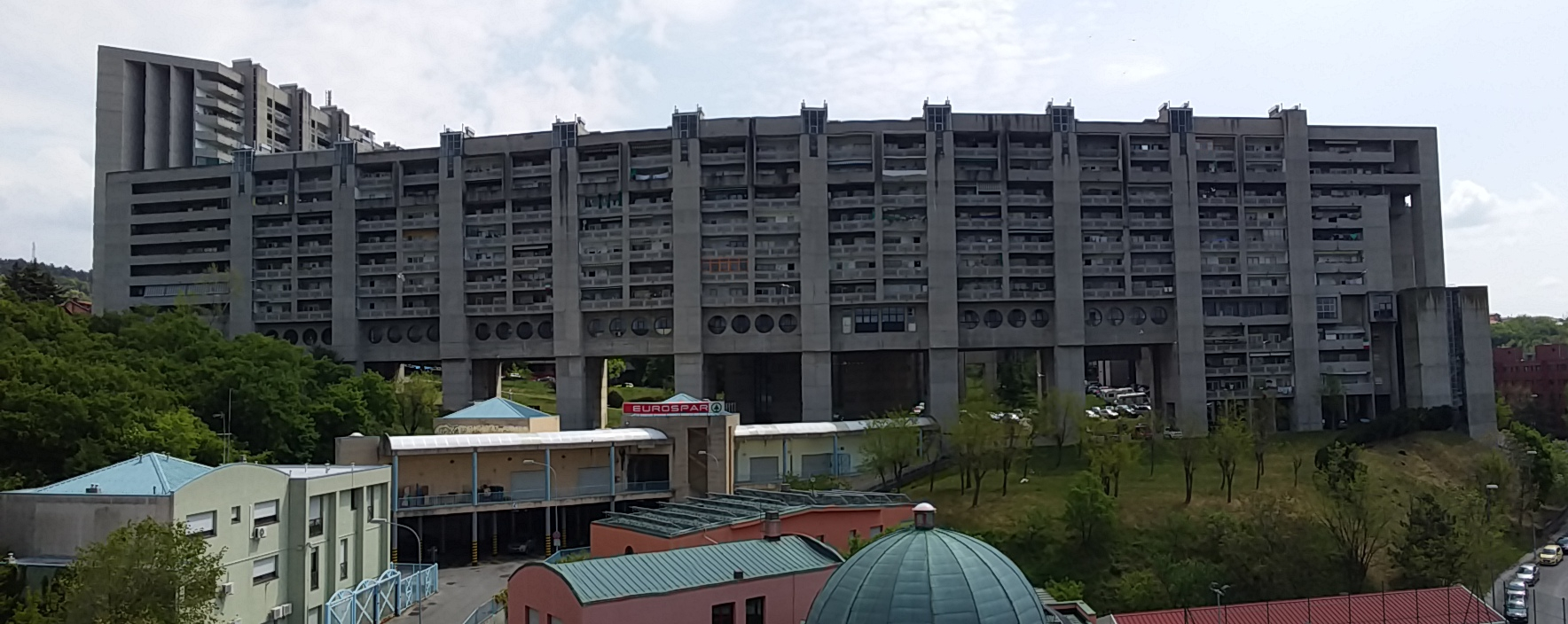

- Location within Italy Location within Friuli-Venezia Giulia
- Coordinates: 45°38′21″N 13°49′29″E
- Country: Italy
- Region: Friuli-Venezia Giulia
- Frazione: Trieste

Population (2011)
  - Total: 4,000
- Area code: 040

Rozzol in Valle and Rozzol in Monte (Slovene: Rocol) are neighborhoods in Trieste, Italy.

Other neighborhoods include: Servola, Scorcola, San Giusto, Campi Elisi, San Vito, Grignano, Chiadino, Guardiella, Roiano, Gretta, Barcola, Longera, Sottolongera, Chiarbola, Campanelle, Altura, Cacciatore, Monte Radio, Sottomonte, Bovedo, Cedas, Scala Santa, Borgo San Sergio, San Luigi, Cologna, Valmaura, Borgo Teresiano, Cattinara, Le Rive, San Giovanni, San Giacomo, and probably others.
