= Antonio Fonda Savio =

- Born: 19 September 1895; Trieste, Austro-Hungarian Empire
- Died: 17 August 1973 (aged 77); Trieste, Italy
- Military career
- Allegiance: Kingdom of Italy
- Branch: Royal Italian Army
- Rank: Colonel
- Conflicts: World War I; Second Battle of the Piave River; World War II; Liberation of Trieste
- Awards: Silver Medal of Military Valour; Order of Merit of the Italian Republic

Antonio Fonda Savio (Trieste, 19 September 1895 – 17 August 1973) was an Italian officer and Resistance member during World War II.

== Biography ==
Fonda Savio was born in 1895 in Trieste, then part of the Austro-Hungarian Empire, but volunteered for the Royal Italian Army when the Kingdom of Italy entered the First World War on 24 May 1915. He fought on the Italian Front with the rank of artillery lieutenant, and in 1917 he was promoted to captain for war merit and transferred to the bombardiers; in 1918 he was awarded a Silver Medal of Military Valor for his conduct during the Second Battle of the Piave River. In 1919 he married Letizia Svevo, daughter of the writer Italo Svevo, with whom he had three children, Paolo (born in 1920), Pietro (born in 1921), and Sergio (born in 1924). During the interwar period, he was promoted to major and later lieutenant colonel of the Army reserve.

During the Second World War his sons Pietro and Paolo, both Alpini officers, were captured on the Eastern Front during the retreat of the ARMIR and died in Soviet captivity in 1943. After the Armistice of Cassibile and the German occupation of Italy, Fonda Savio joined the Italian Resistance, becoming one of the leaders of the National Liberation Committee of Trieste; on 30 April 1945 he led the uprising in Trieste against the German garrison, alongside CLN heads Ercole Miani (Action Party) and Edoardo Marzari (Catholic). His last son, Sergio, was killed by a grenade during the fighting on 1 May 1945. After the city was occupied by the Yugoslav People's Liberation Army, Fonda Savio opposed Yugoslav plans to annex the city to Yugoslavia.

After the war, Fonda Savio was president of the Trieste Gymnastics Society and of the Circle of Culture and Arts for several decades, as well as senior adviser of the Bank of Italy in Rome, and vice-president of Lloyd Triestino. He was promoted to colonel in the Army reserve and made a Knight of the Grand Cross of the Order of Merit of the Italian Republic. He died in Trieste on August 17, 1973. A mountain hut in the Cadini di Misurina has been named after him and his sons.
