= Piazza Venezia, Trieste =

Square in Trieste, Italy

Coordinates: 45°38′49.17″N 13°45′44.32″E

Piazza Venezia
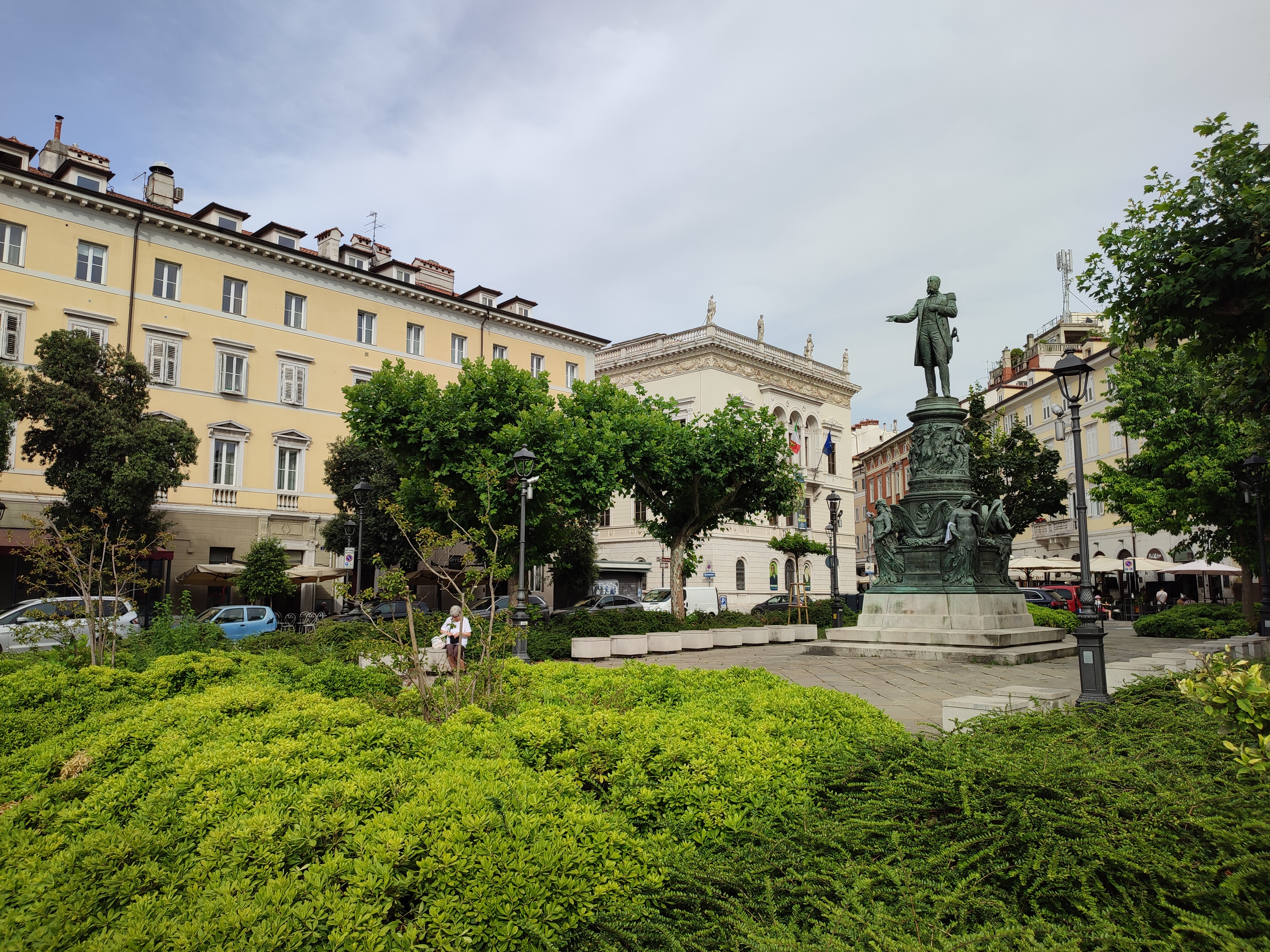
- Piazza Venezia, with the Revoltella Palace on the left, the Mizzan on the right and Maximilian's monument between them
- Interactive map of Piazza Venezia
- Type: Public square
- Location: Trieste, Friuli Venezia Giulia, Italy
- Quarter: Borgo Giuseppino
- Postal code: 34123

Construction
- Completion: 19th century

Other
- Known for: Maritime heritage, monuments, museums

Piazza Venezia (Italian pronunciation: [ˈpjattsa veˈnɛttsja]; "Venice Square") is one of the best known squares of Trieste, the capital of Friuli-Venezia Giulia, Italy. The square has a view over the Adriatic to the Alps with the Dolomite Mountains Civetta, Monte Pelmo and Antelao. The square is known for its central monument and its prominent buildings and their features: the Revoltella Palace designed by Friedrich Hitzig, with its furnishings and art collection, today including over 350 pieces, the historic Mizzan pharmacy, still conserving the original furnishing, with carved boiserie and fire-worked stained glass windows with mythological images, and the monument of Maximilian I of Mexico, the work of sculptor Johannes Schilling. The square is connected to via Torino, often credited as the center of Trieste's nightlife.

== Description ==
=== Revoltella Palace ===
The square, previously known as piazza Ganza, was created following the burial of the streets facing the sea. The ground consisted of earth until it was paved in 1865.

The Revoltella Palace, located at the civic number 5, was once the abode of entrepreneur Pasquale Revoltella. Today the palace houses the Revoltella Museum, and is noted for its rich furnishing and collection of paintings and sculptures that the Baron Revoltella bequeathed to the city of Trieste. The building was designed by Friedrich Hitzig and built in 1858. The collection bequeathed by Revoltella was enlarged over the years, and today there are about 350 paintings and sculptures on display.

=== Mizzan Pharmacy ===
The historic pharmacy, previously located in via Lazzaretto Vecchio is located inside a palace built in the first half of the 19th century by the neoclassical architect Valentino Valle. It was inaugurated on January 1, 1903, in piazza Giuseppina. Piazza Venezia was previously called Giuseppina, like the Borgo Giuseppino, in honor of Joseph II, Holy Roman Emperor. The pharmacy was bought in 1900 by the Mizzan family, the owners of several pharmacies across the Julian March, including Cittanova's (Mizzan) and Fiume's Alla Salute. It was owned by the family for over 70 years. Today known as "Al Sant'Andrea", the pharmacy is still called "Mizzan" by Trieste's senior citizens. The last proprietor of the pharmacy, Ettore, used labels realized by Argio Orel and Vito Timmel. On the day of its opening, the wideness and the modernity of the pharmacy were emphasized. Today there are still preserved the original decorations and furnishing, including carved boiserie and fire-worked stained glass windows with mythological images. Since its opening, the pharmacy has been renowned for the laboratory of the well-known Doctor Mizzan, a tradition which it has kept to this day.

The palace housing the pharmacy is considered one of the best works by Valle, who signed the project on March 8, 1834. It has four floors. The ground floor has an exterior in smooth ashlar, in which five round arches are set. The mural surface is enriched by four Doric pilaster strips of giant order. The windows on the second floor present linear cymatium, sustained by volutes in white stone. The facade folds in an obtuse angle, and on its shorter side on via Torino there is the gate, overhung by a balustrade balcony which was added later, in 1861.

=== Maximilian's monument ===
In the center of the square there is the monument of Maximilian I of Mexico, who built the Miramare Castle, one of the symbols of the city, and was instrumental in creating the naval port of Trieste. The statue is one of the best known statues of Maximilian and of the city of Trieste. The monument is the work of German sculptor Johannes Schilling. It was inaugurated on April 3, 1875, in the presence of Emperor Franz Joseph. The monument is made of bronze and about 9-meter-tall. Maximilian is dressed as an admiral, and he stands on a pedestal decorated with an alto-rilievo depicting the Austrian and Trieste's emblems. Around the octagonal base there are the personifications of the four cardinal points, alternated with medallions with the symbols of the arts, science, poetry and industry. Orient is represented as a woman holding a shoot, with a crescent moon and a star; Occident is represented by a bare-chested woman with the evening star and a trident, the South is an Egyptian with a palm branch, and the North a bearded man with a harp and a hawser.

When Trieste became part of Italy in 1918, the monument was removed by the authorities. In 1961 it was placed at the Miramare Castle Park, and only in 2009 it returned to Piazza Venezia.

=== Scuglievich Palace ===
On the square's western side there is the Palazzo Scuglievich, built in 1832 after the project of architect Domenico Corti, who is credited with having imprinted on the neighborhood its style. The palace was renovated and significantly changed in 1863, and in 1876 it was acquired by Mostar-born merchant Cristoforo Scuglievich, part of Trieste's Serb-Orthodox community. The palace is known for having hosted Nobel prize winner Ivo Andrić during his stay in Trieste between 1922 and 1923, and today there is plaque commemorating the event on the building's facade. The palace also has a plaque commemorating Scuglievich, located on the ground floor.

== Gallery ==
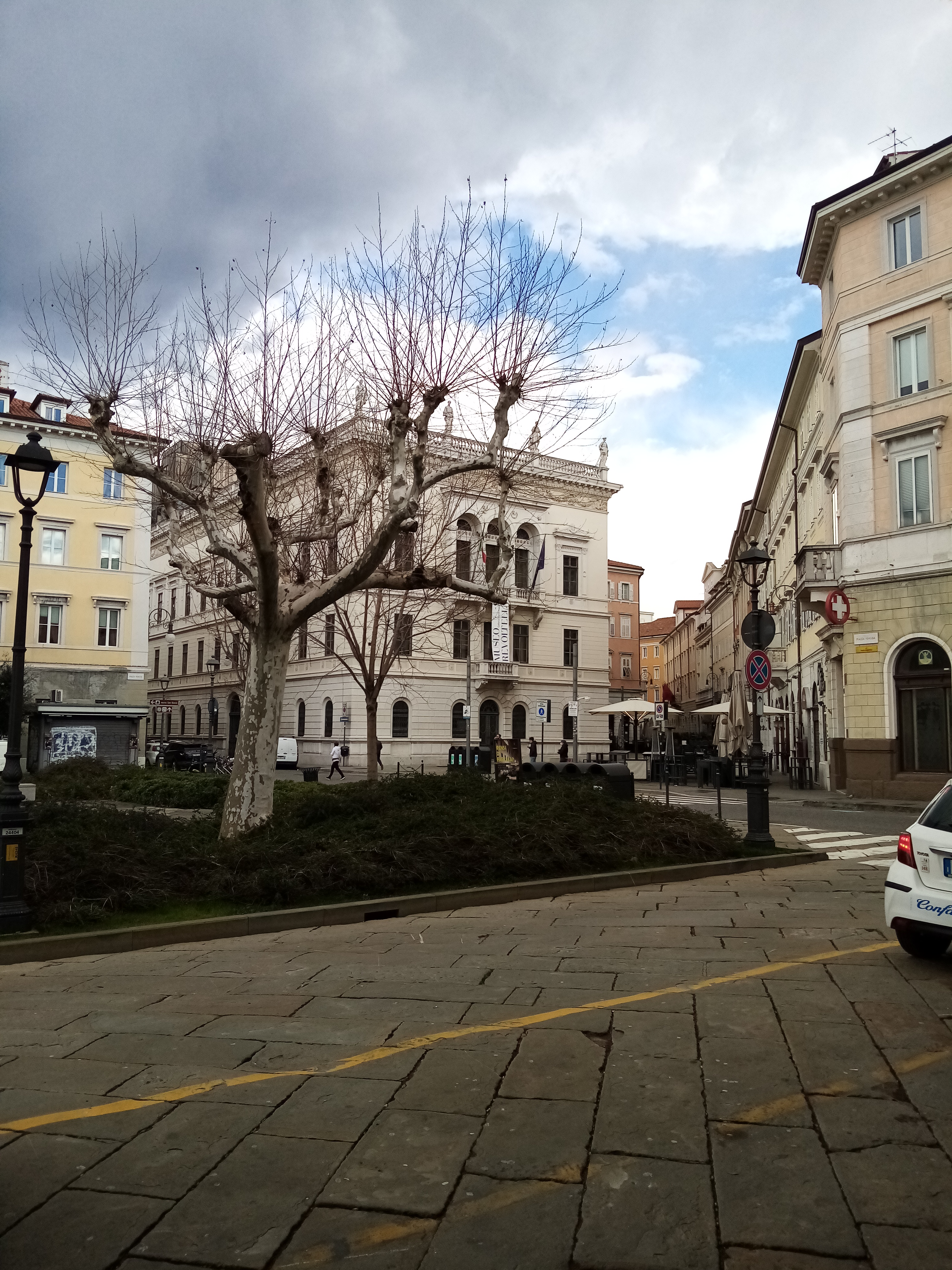
Revoltella Palace

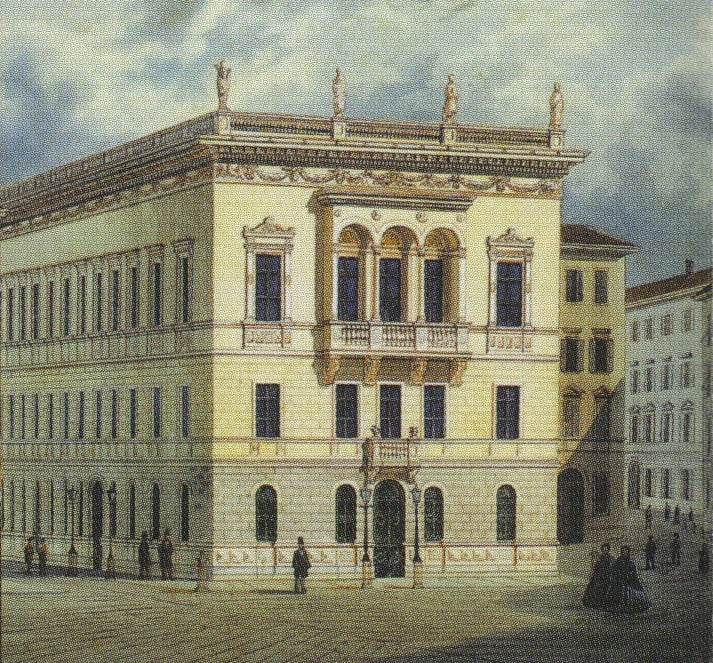
Revoltella Palace, by Alberto Rieger (1865)

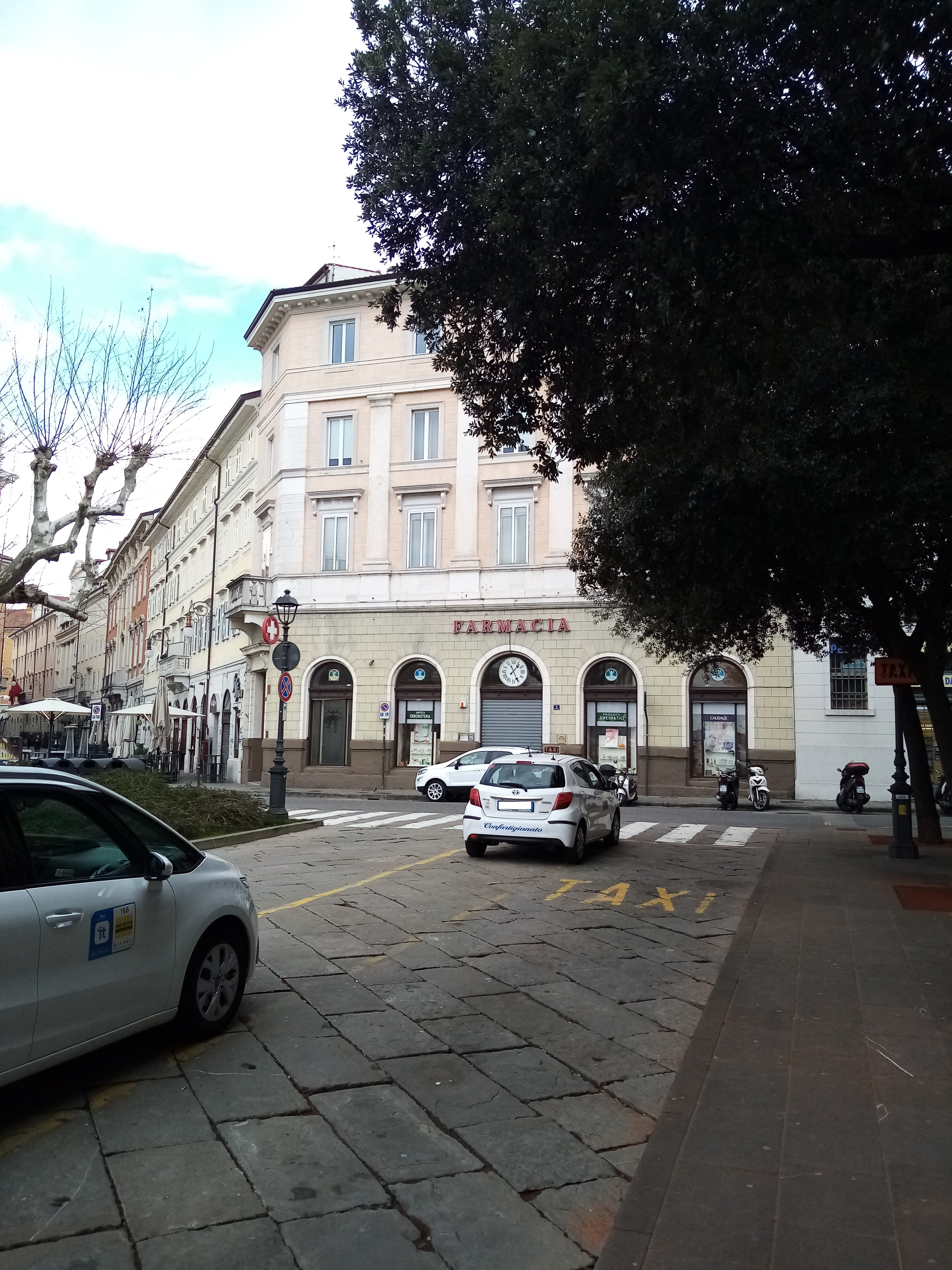
Mizzan pharmacy with via Torino on the left

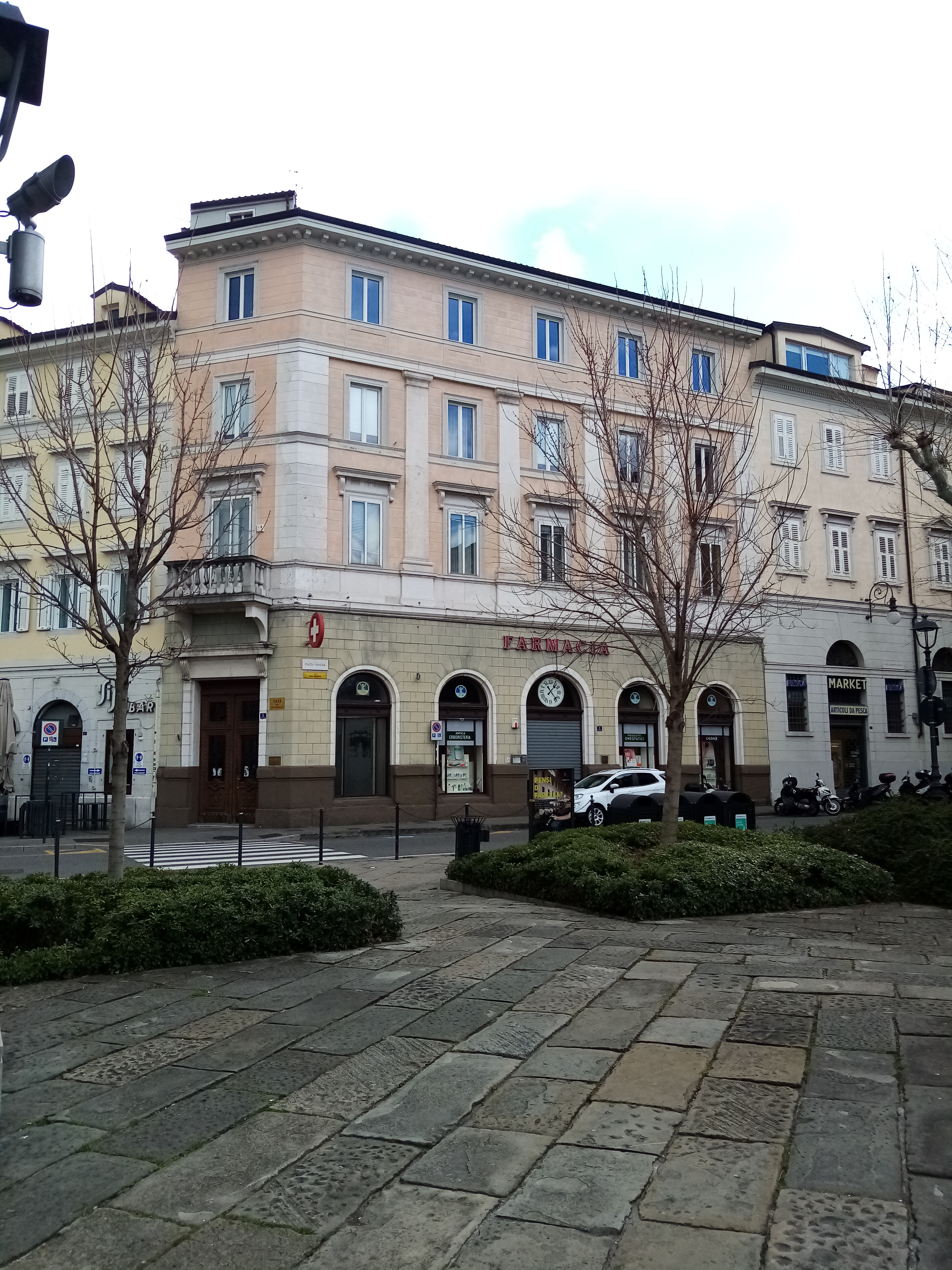
The "Mizzan" (with entrance to the palace overhung by balcony on via Torino)

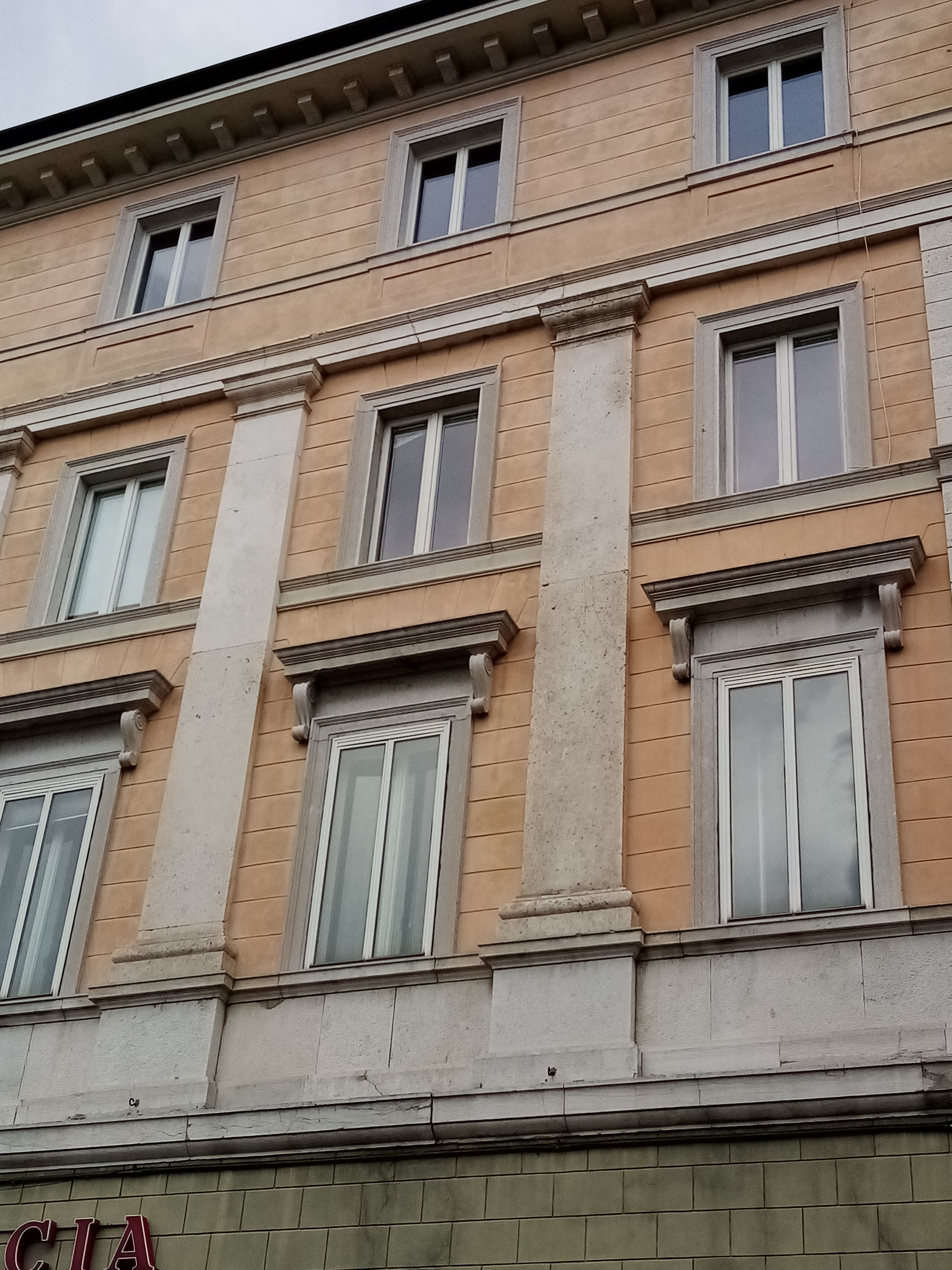
Doric pilaster strips of giant order above pharmacy

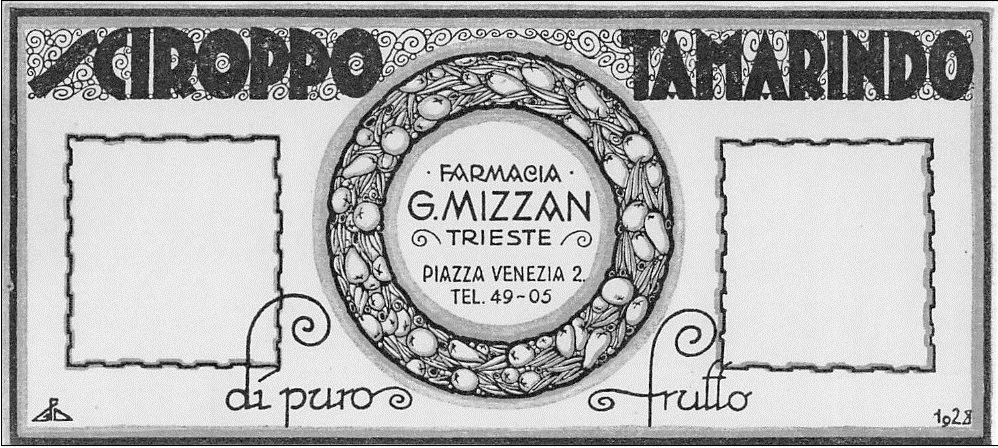
Mizzan Tamarind Syrup, 1928 label

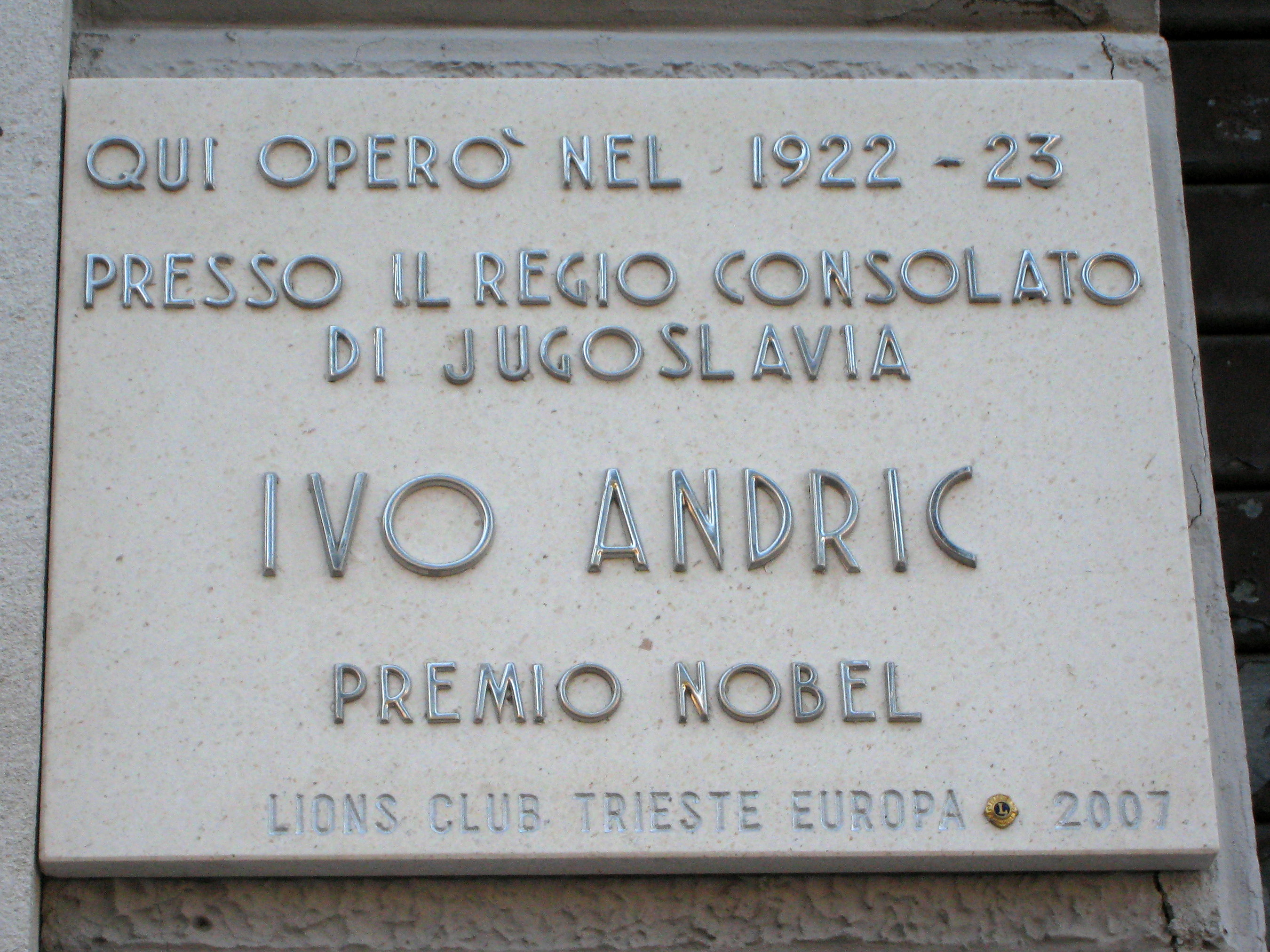
Plaque commemorating Ivo Andrić on Palazzo Scuglievich

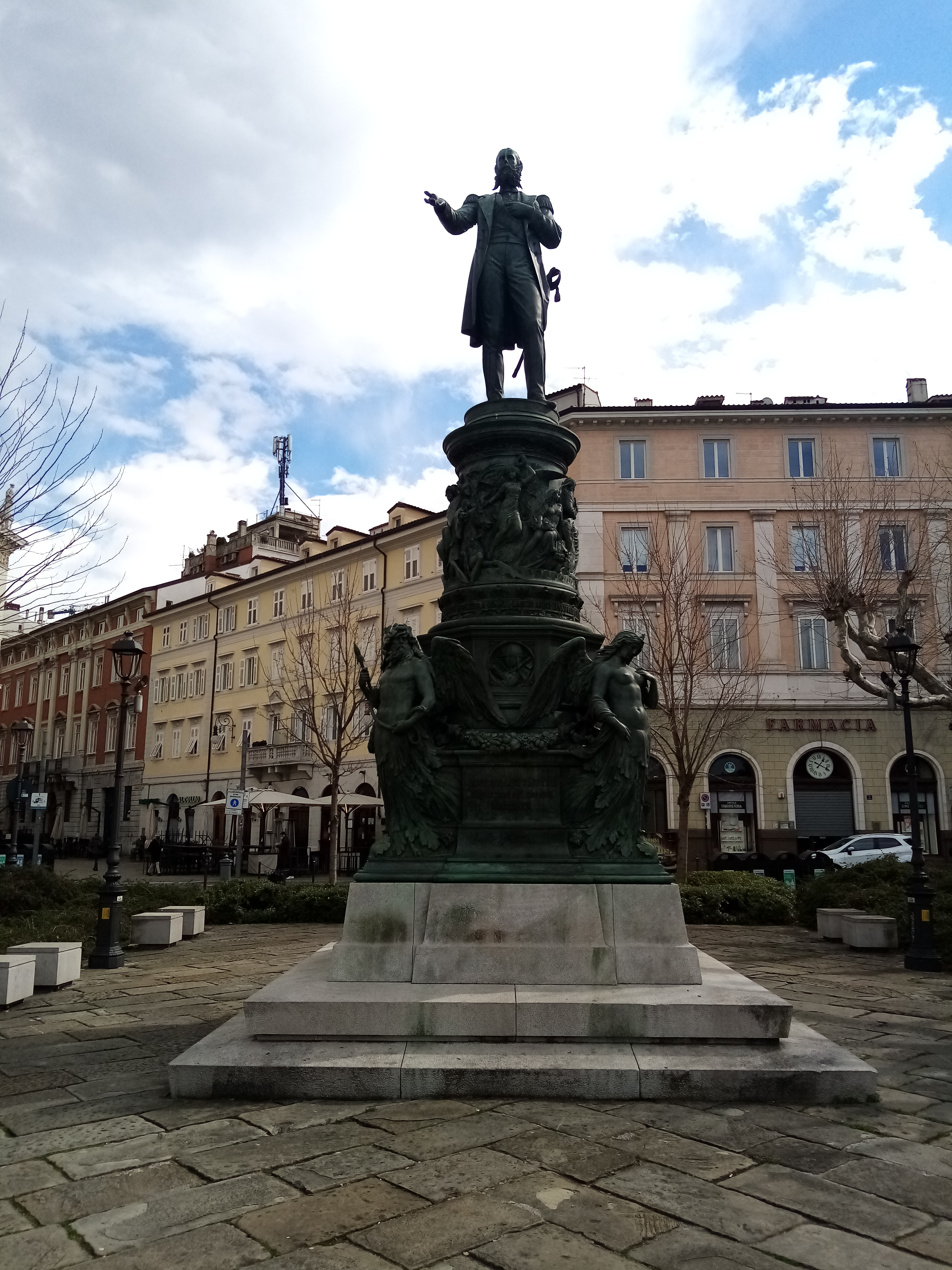
Maximilian Monument

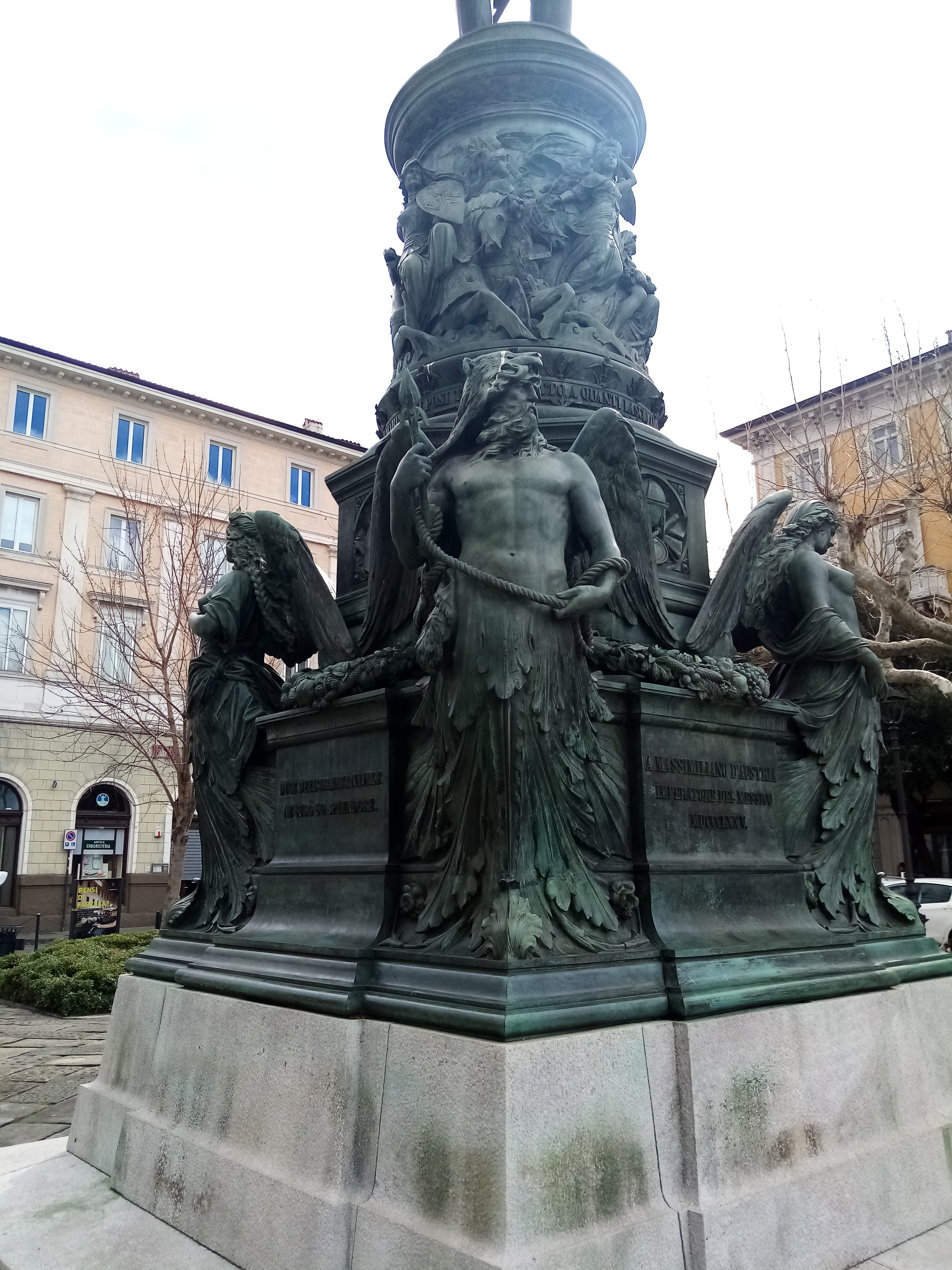
Maximilian monument, detail, the North

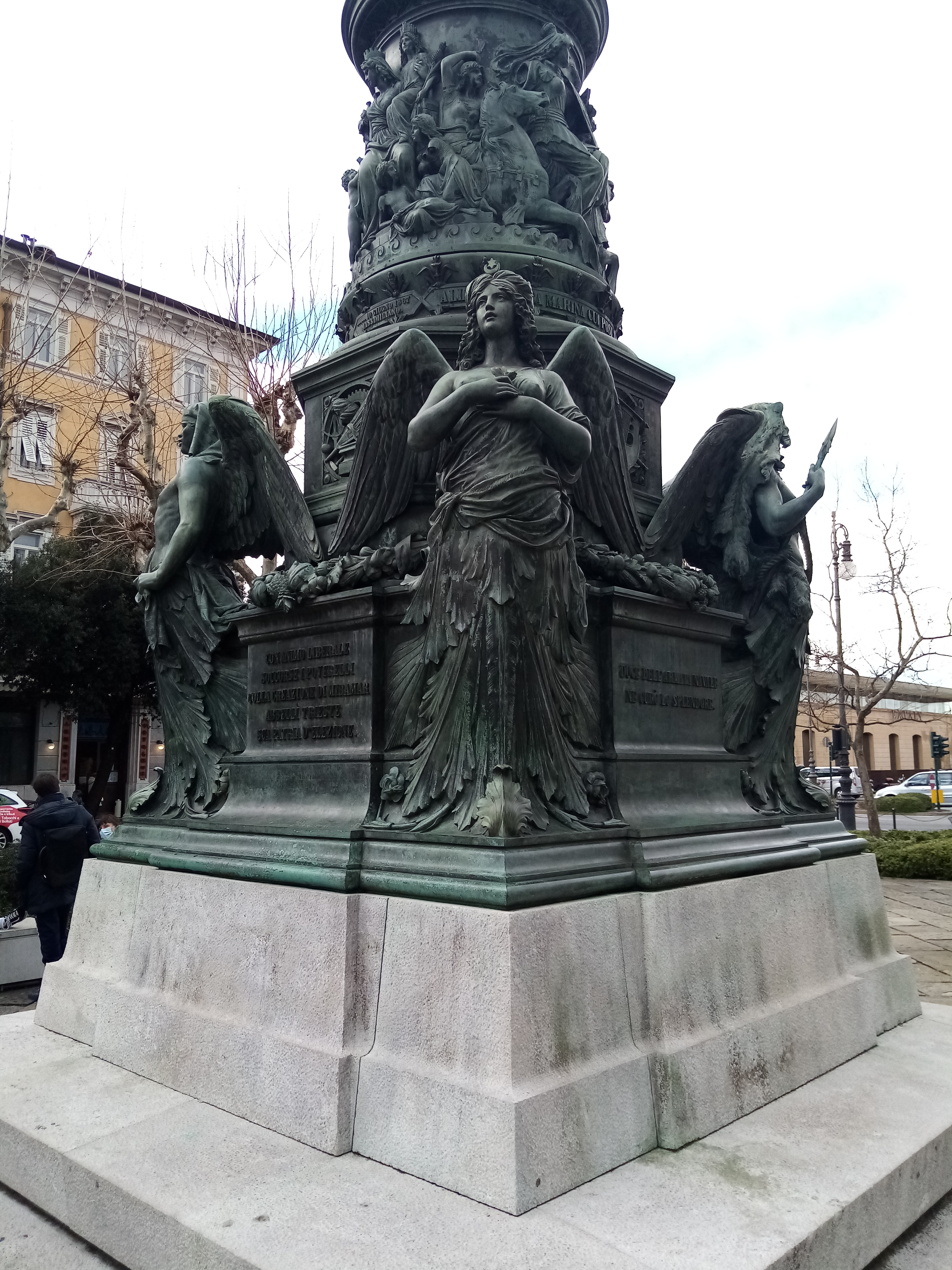
Maximilian Monument, detail, Orient

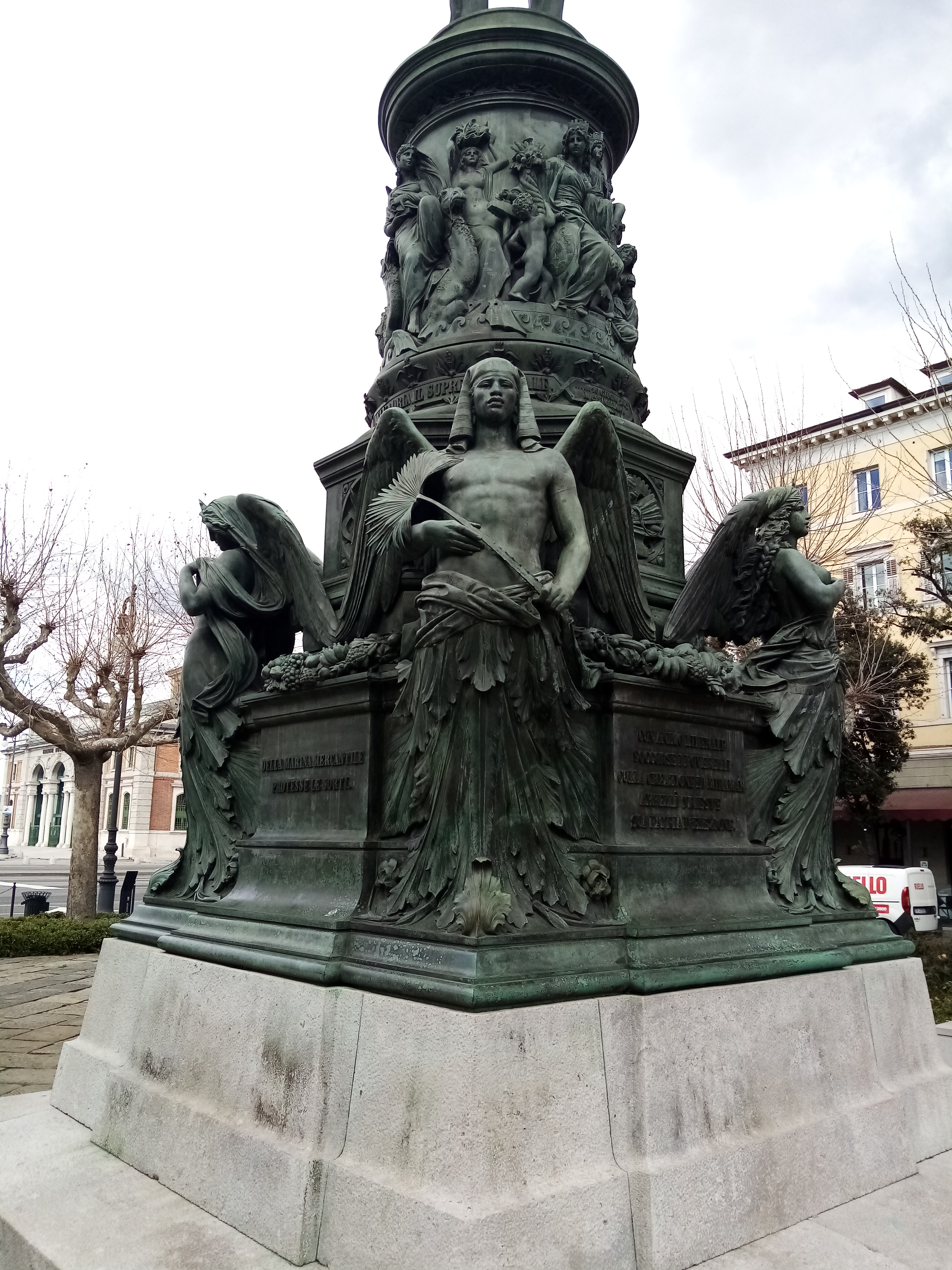
Maximilian Monument, detail, the South

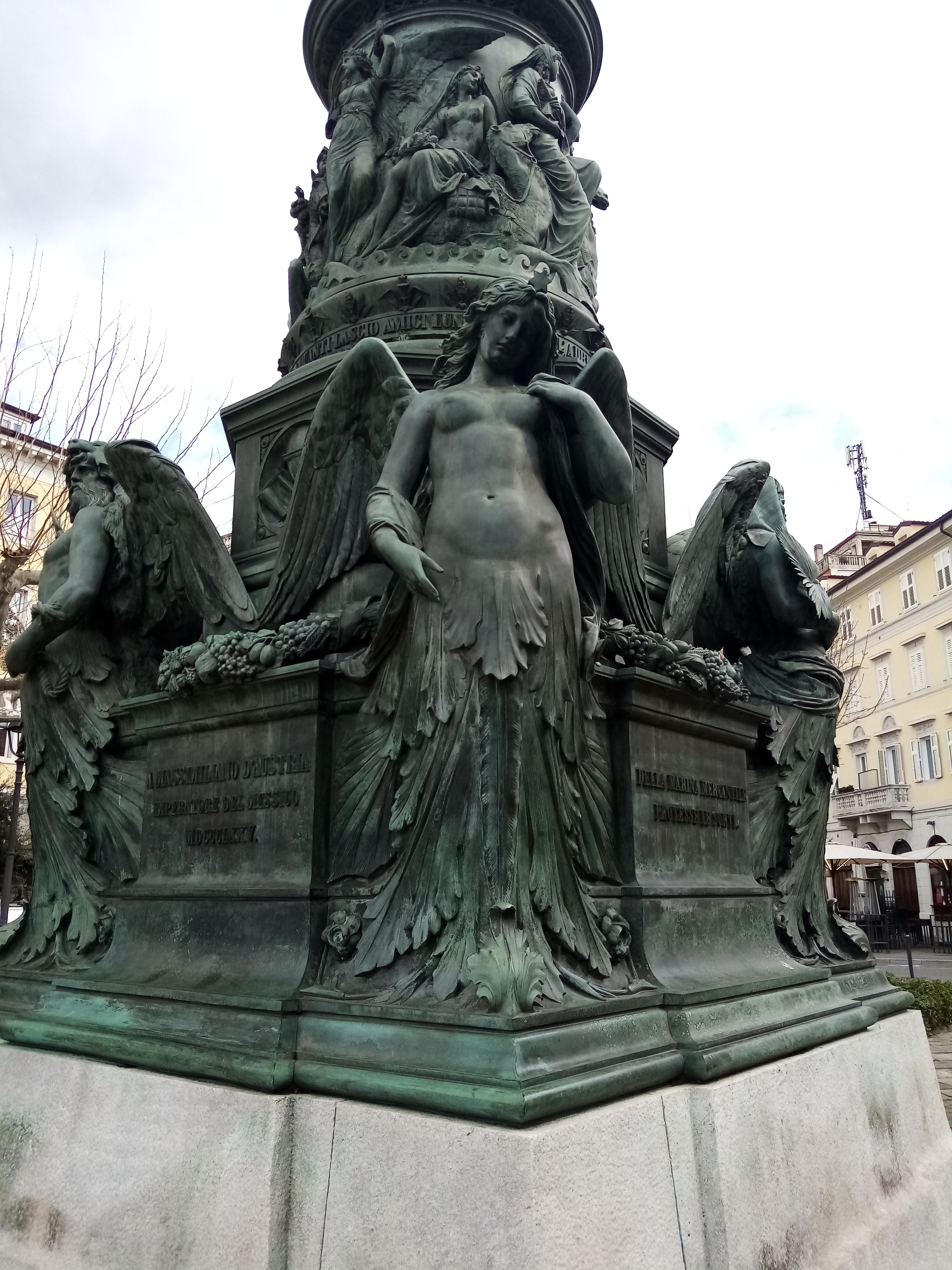
Maximilian Monument, detail, Occident

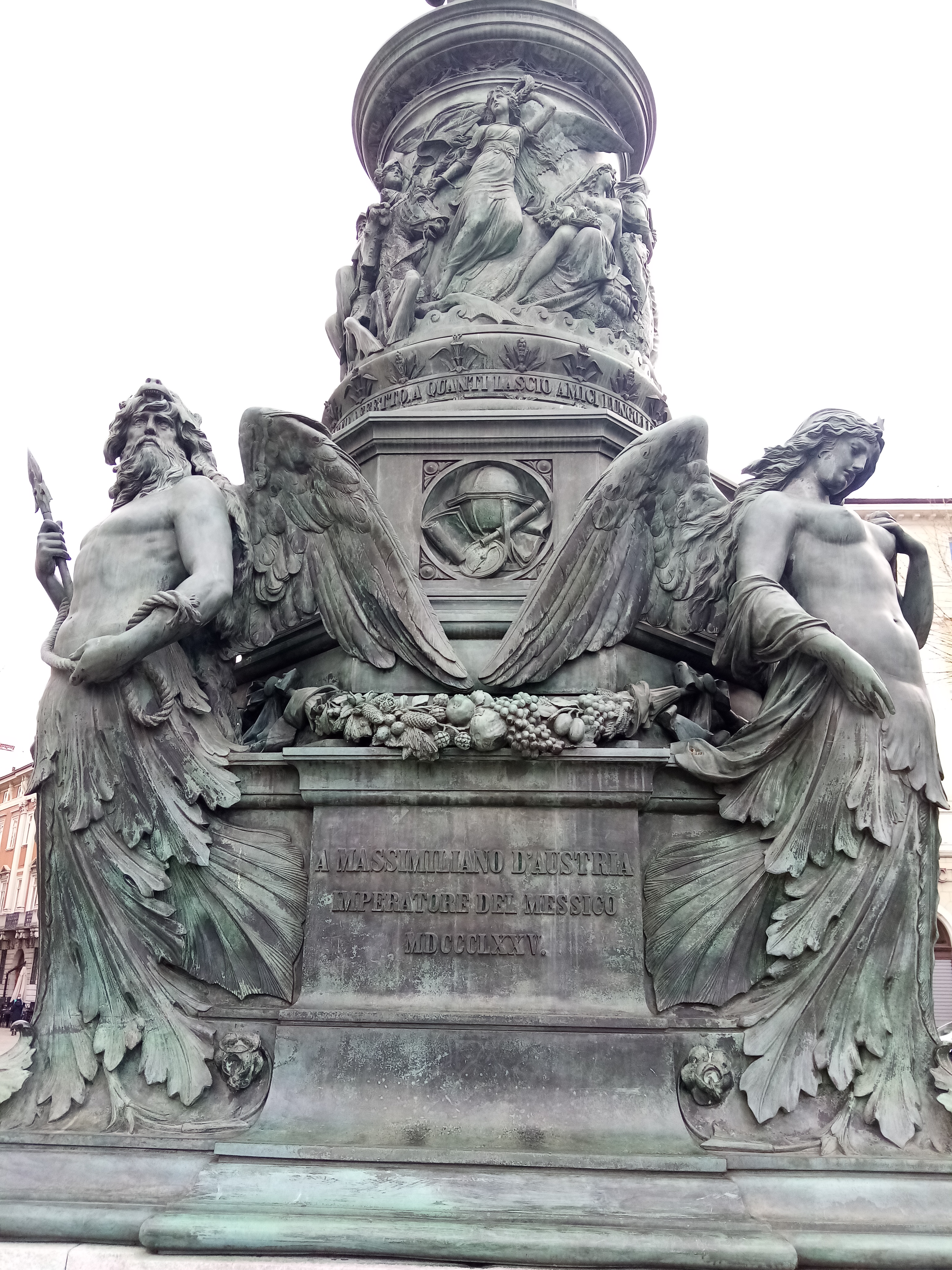
Maximilian Monument, detail, emblems

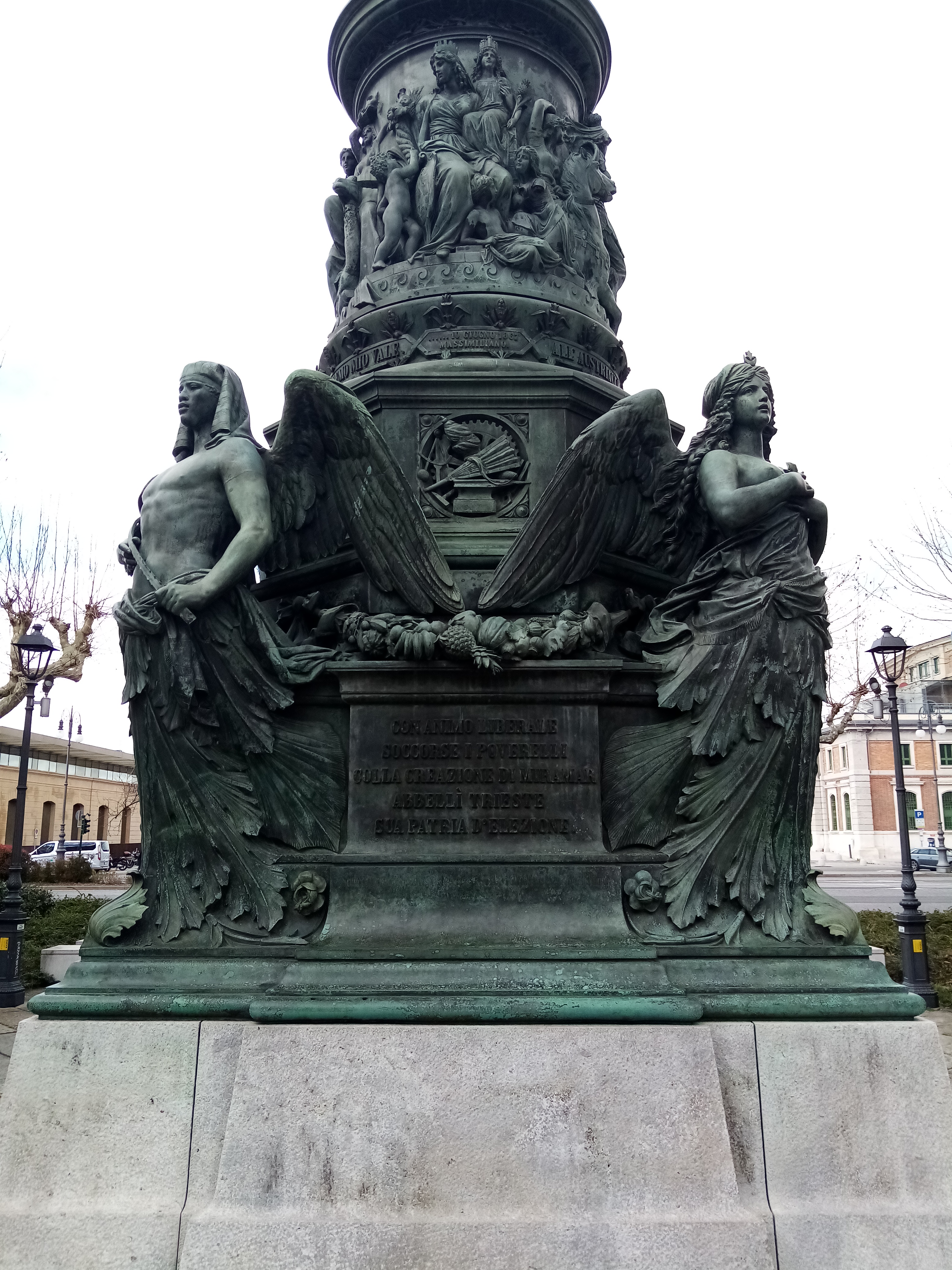
Maximilian Monument, detail, emblems

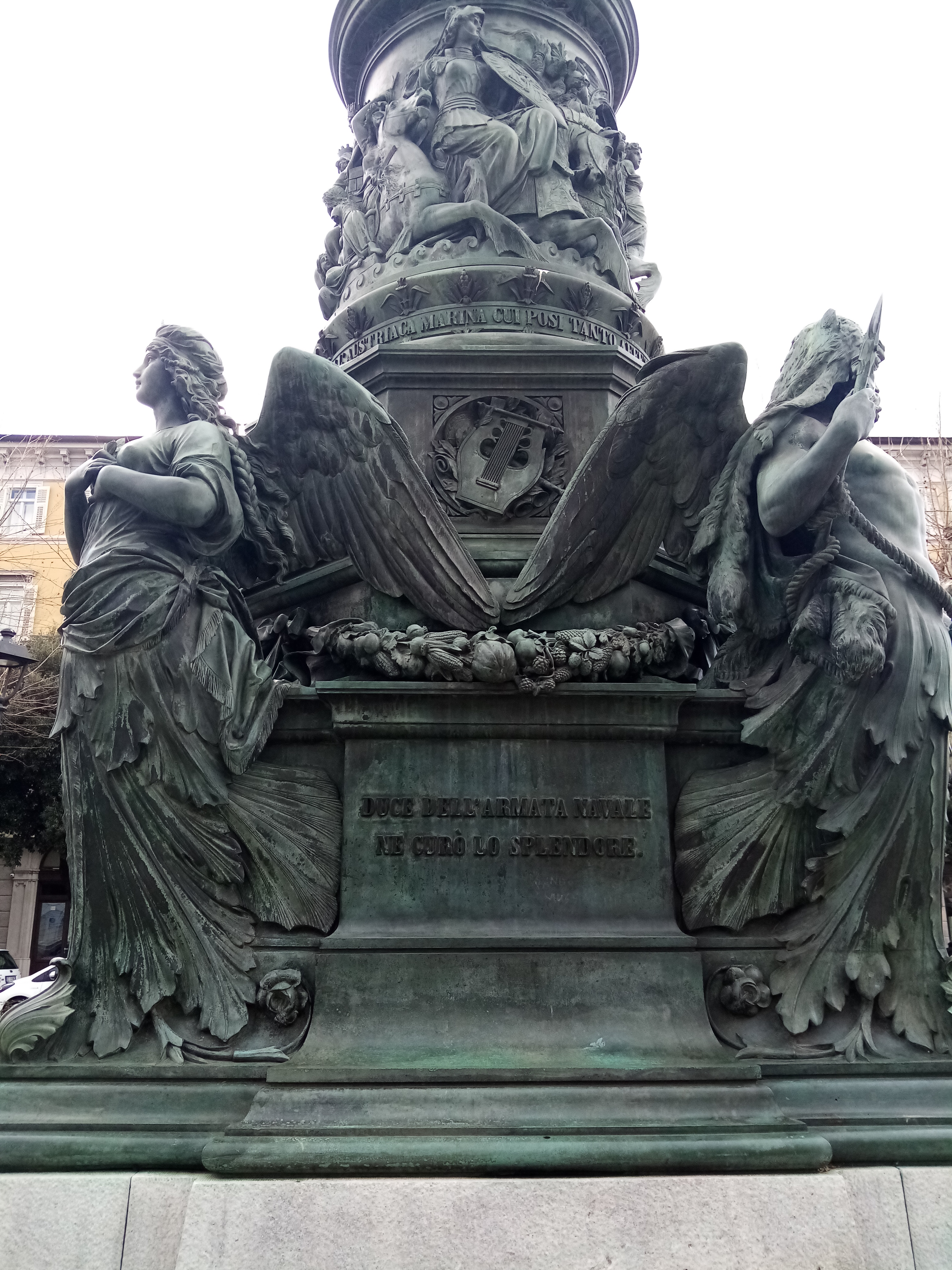
Maximilian Monument, detail, emblems

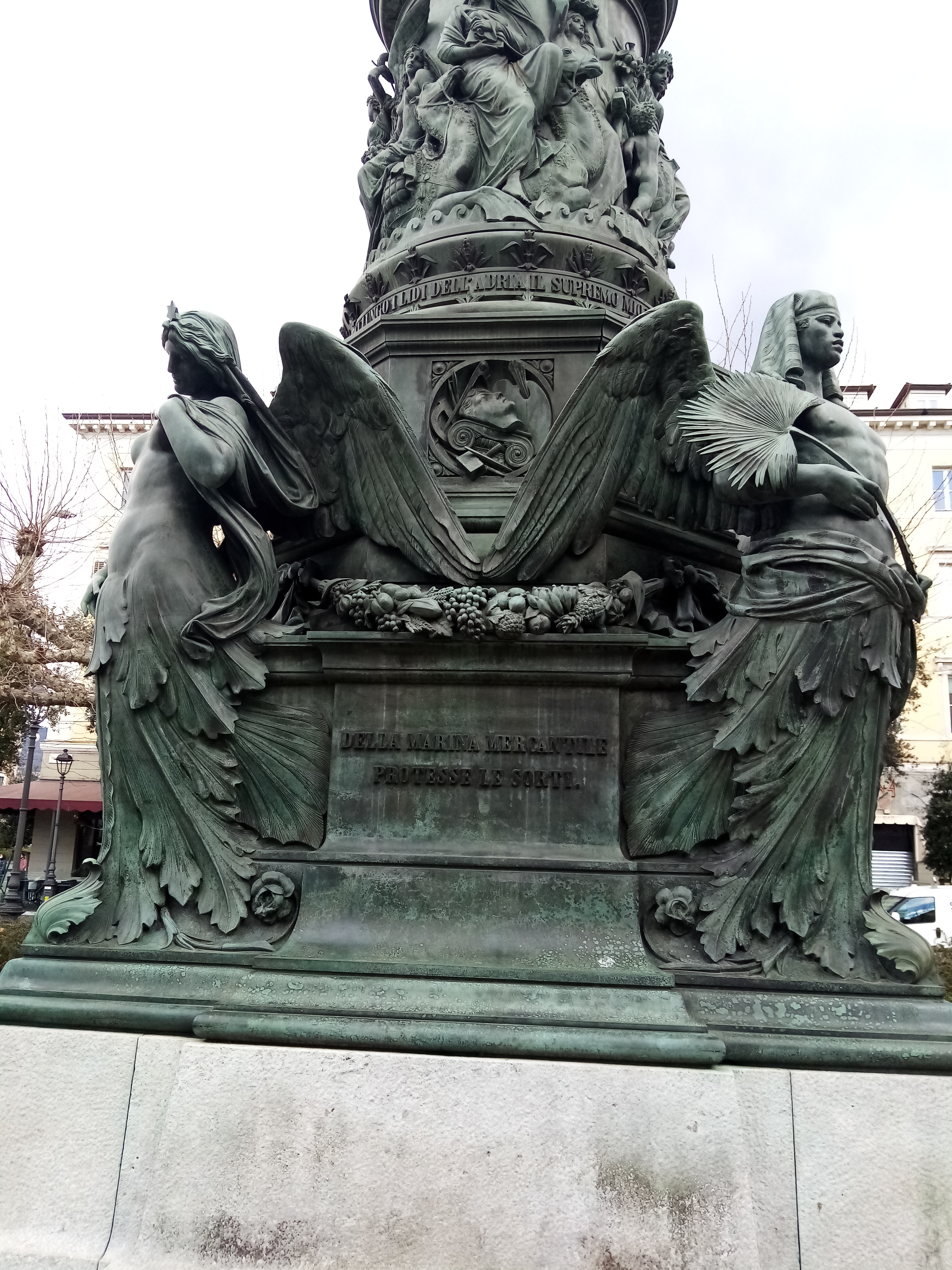
Maximilian Monument, detail, emblems
