= Schilling & Graebner =

Defunct German architecture firm

- Company type: partnership
- Industry: Professional services
- Founded: Dresden, Saxony, Germany (1889)
- Founders: Rudolf Schilling; Julius Graebner
- Area served: Mostly Saxony, Germany
- Key people: Rudolf Schilling, Julius Graebner, Erwin Graebner
- Services: Architecture and urban design & planning

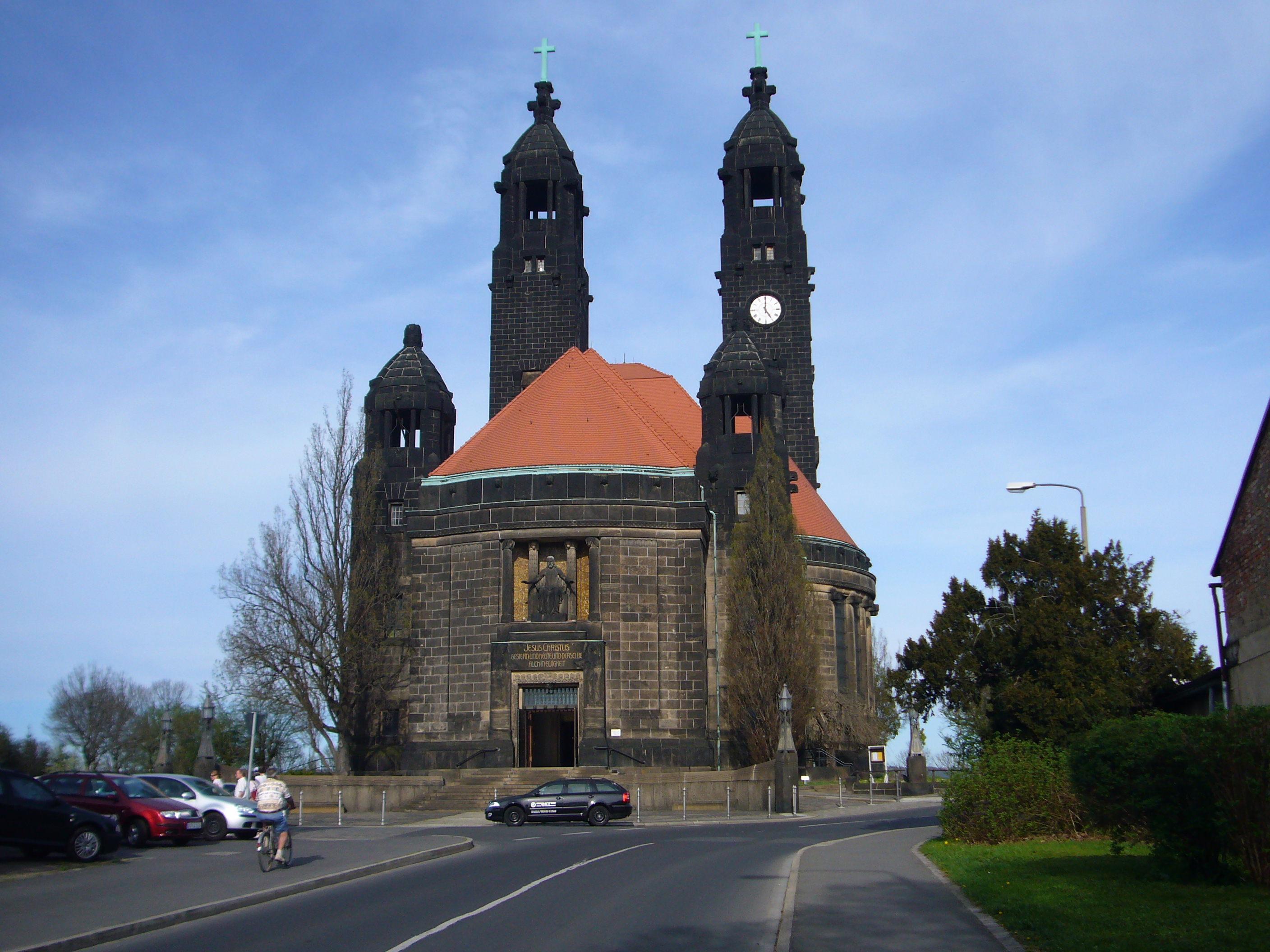
Christuskirche in Dresden-Strehlen

Schilling & Graebner (or Gräbner) was an architecture firm based in Dresden, Germany, founded by the architects Rudolf Schilling (1859–1933) and Julius Graebner (1858–1917) in 1889. The firm was under their direction from 1889 until Graebner's death, but continued to exist until 1947, most notably under Graebner's son Erwin (1895–1945). The firm, which initially devoted itself primarily to historicism and later to Art Nouveau and early modernism, worked on mainly buildings in Saxony, including several noteworthy churches, Dresden villas, administrative buildings and entire residential districts. One of the firms' most important works is the Christuskirche in Dresden (1903–1905), which arguably marks the transition of sacral architecture in Germany from historicism to modernity.

== Early life and formation of the partnership ==
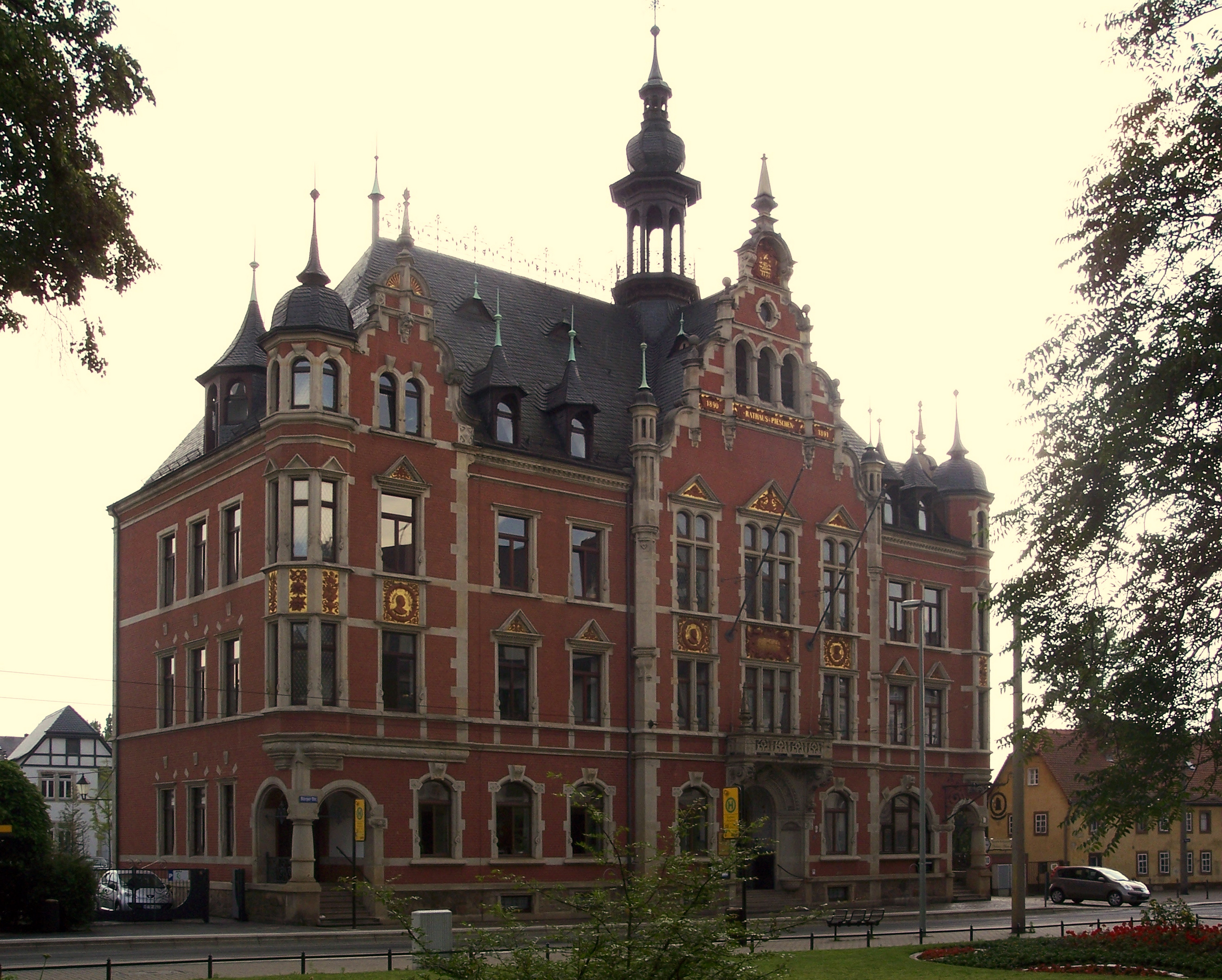
Pieschen Town Hall.

Both Schilling and Graebner had met each other when they were just over 20 years old around 1881 while studying architecture at the Polytechnikum Dresden. Even when they initially went their separate ways after completing their training, they did not lose touch, especially since they both worked in Berlin in two different offices in the mid-1880s. The two architects, who were roughly the same age, complemented each other very well. Together they were a formidable and very versatile team, as evidenced by the fact that they not only designed very complex buildings, but they also showed great stylistic differences amongst their entire oeuvre. Schilling, as the son of the well-known sculptor Johannes Schilling, provided the necessary start-up capital and contacts to numerous potential clients. Graebner's strength, on the other hand, was more artistic design.

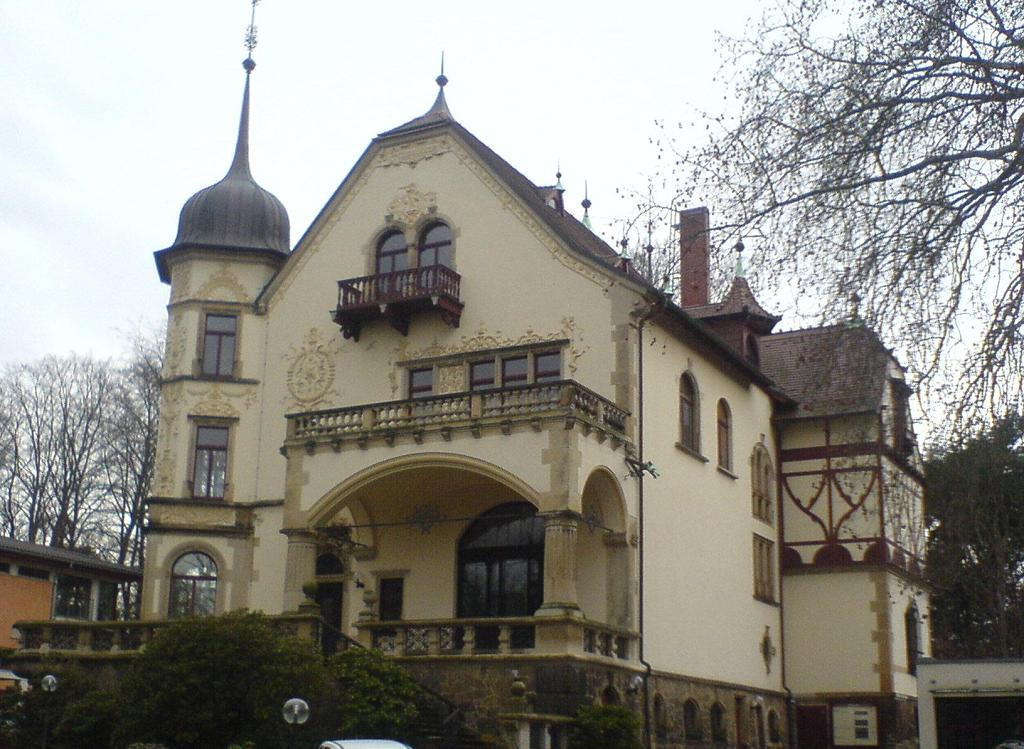
Villa Muttersegen in Dresden-Blasewitz.

Schilling and Graebner hired several trained architects in their firm over the years, including Oswald Bieber, Heino Otto and Johannes Rascher. During the late nineteenth century, their biggest local competitors were probably William Lossow and Fritz Schumacher. At that time, Schilling and Graebner were the leading architects of the fifth largest city in the German Empire. They were generally considered within the first rank of German architects and were particularly regarded as experts in contemporary Protestant church architecture. They were also inspired in their work by suggestions from Franz Wilhelm Dibelius and Cornelius Gurlitt.

== Stylistic evolution ==
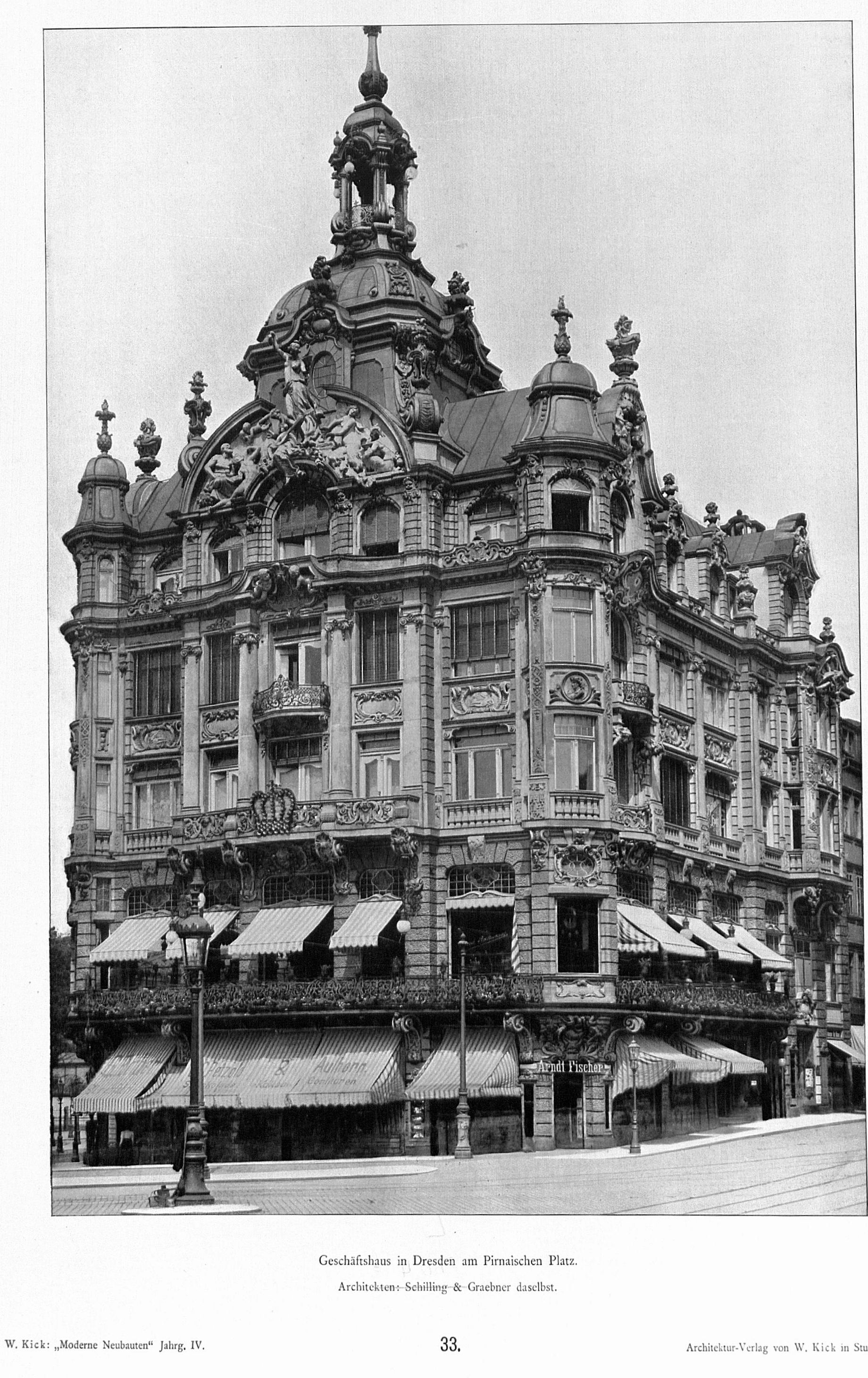
Kaiserpalast in Dresden (1897).

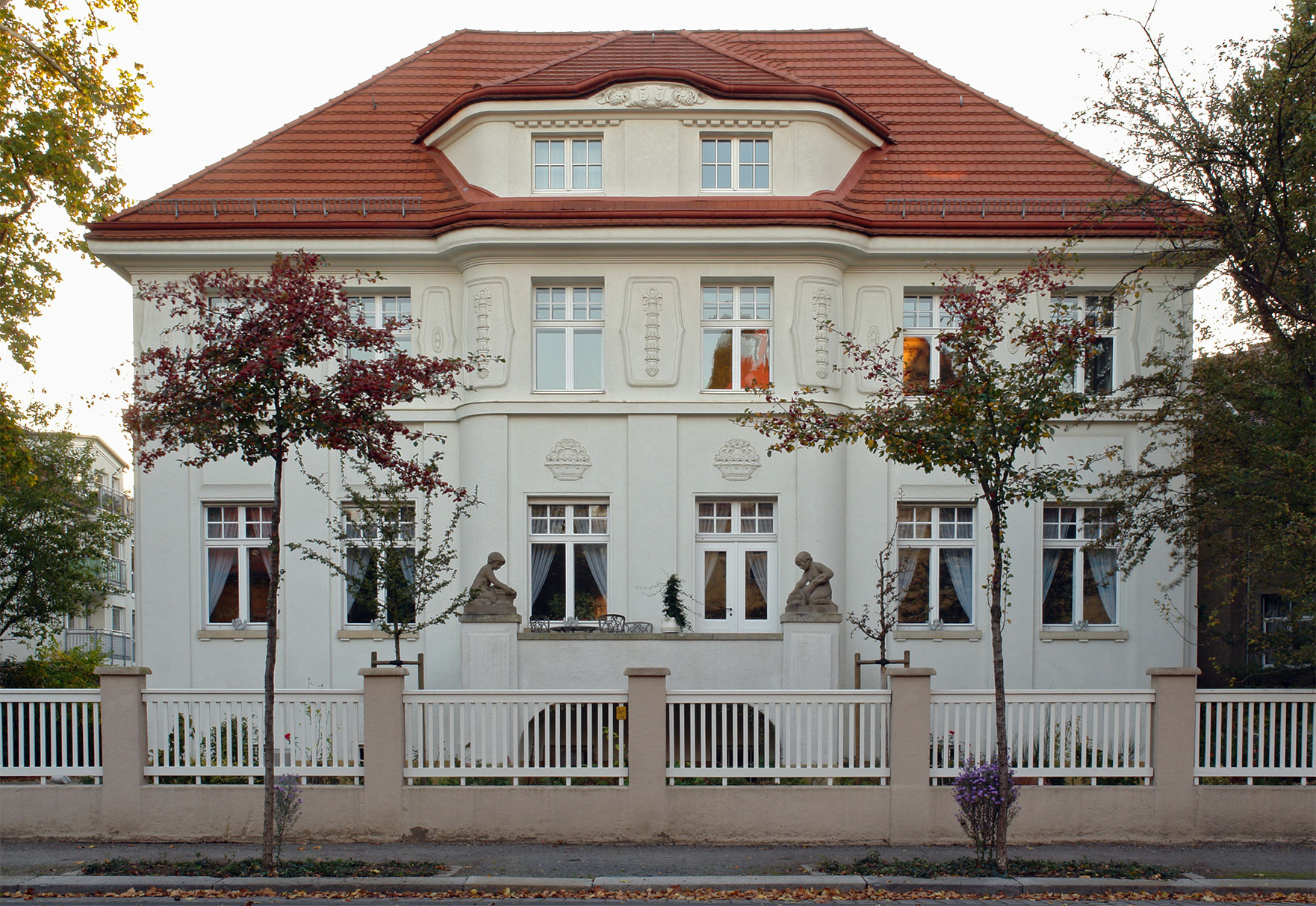
Villa Würzburger in Dresden.

At first, Schilling & Graebner preferred late historicism in their works in Dresden. Their first building commission, the Pieschen town hall, completed in 1891, shows clear features of the Neo-Renaissance, as well as the Villa Muttersegen built in 1891 in Blasewitz or the Lutherkirche in Radebeul. In the years before the turn of the century, Schilling and Graebner also designed neo-baroque buildings, such the commercial building called the Imperial Palace for Hermann Ilgen at Pirnaischer Platz that burned in 1945 during the bombing of Dresden and was later demolished. In 1895 they also designed the neo-baroque interior of the Schellenberger City Church of St. Peter, which was destroyed after a fire. and around 1900 that of the Dresden Kreuzkirche. The latter also showed a significant influence from Jugendstil. For a long time, Schilling and Graebner represented the views in line with the development of Heimatschutz Architecture as it emerged around the turn of the century.

With their practice flourishing, in 1899 Schilling and Graebner bought the large winery of Altfriedstein in the present Radebeul district of Dresden and developed the site by laying roads and parcelling the abandoned wine-growing areas into a "Villa Colony Altfriedstein." To do this, they tore down the west wing of the mansion and all the outbuildings of the winery and redesigned the west gable of the remaining east wing. Among other things, they built a pedestrian passage through the corner of the building on the ground floor. From 1902 until the First World War they built numerous villas and country houses there, many of them in the Heimatschutzstil, also called the "Reform Architecture Style."

After about 1902, Schilling and Graebner tried to overcome historicism and turned more to a kind of proto-modernism, which was particularly difficult in church building due to the Eisenach regulations that applied there. The first signs of modernity are the residential buildings built in the early twentieth century for the Dresdner Spar- und Bauverein with their austere facades and high functionality. The Christuskirche in Strehlen, built in 1903–05, went far beyond Art Nouveau and points in this direction, which is also very clearly expressed in the Zionskirche in the Dresden Südvorstadt built in 1912–14, but partially destroyed in 1945. This pioneering work also meant that the two architects were invited to join several professional associations. Graebner was member of the directorate of the Dürerbund. As members of the Deutscher Werkbund Schilling and Graebner designed many of their later villas, public and sacral buildings according to the principles of modernity as propagated by this association of artists and industry. The former Zionskirche, built from 1908 to 1912 and destroyed in 1945, was an extraordinary example of this architectural style. However, despite this general line of evolution, it is worth noting Schilling and Graebner also liked to experiment with mixtures of styles.

== Work after 1917 ==
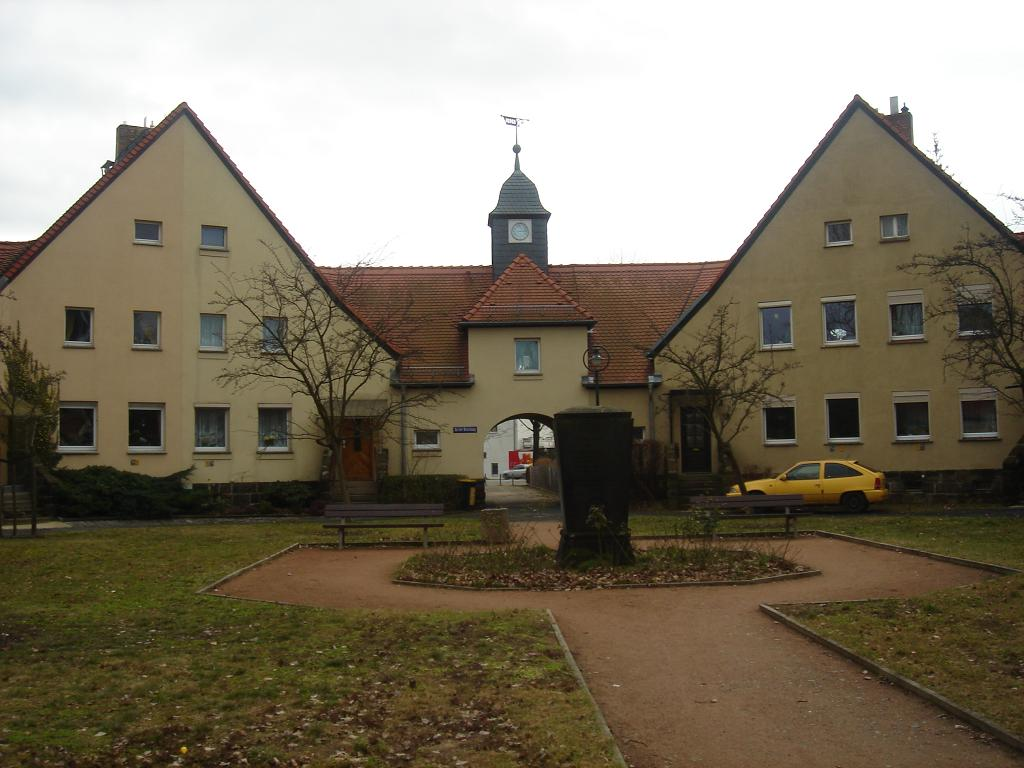
Kriegersiedlung in Trachau.

After Julius Graebner died in 1917, the firm was continued by his son Erwin Graebner, who returned from the Western Front in October 1918, and replaced his father in partnership with Rudolf Schilling. During this period, further plans for larger buildings such as the Kriegersiedlung in Trachau and the development on the west side of Aachener Strasse in Dresden were implemented. Schilling died in 1933 and Erwin Graebner ran the office alone from then on. During this time he developed, among other things, the plans for several factory buildings of the Leipziger Kammgarnspinnerei, which were blown up in 2007 and captured on video. In 1947, two years after Erwin Graebner's death, the firm was finally dissolved.

== Selected works ==
=== Villas ===
- Goetheallee 24 (Pernwaldhaus/Villa Muttersegen), Blasewitz, begun 1891, Neo-Renaissance
- Goetheallee 26 (de:Villa Fliederhof), built in 1891, burned down and demolished in 1979
- Kaitzer Str. 82, Dresden-Plauen, built in 1891, renovated in 1999
- Barteldesplatz 2, Blasewitz, 1893, Neo-Renaissance style, today the seat of the Bürgerstiftung Dresden
- Goetheallee 43, Blasewitz, 1894, eclectic
- Extension to the Villa Zillerstraße 5, Niederlößnitz, 1895
- de:Villa Friedrichsruh, Hermsdorfer Straße 16, Löbtau, 1898
- de:Villa Rautendelein for Gerhart Hauptmann, Hochuferstraße 12 (today Käthe-Kollwitz-Ufer 84), Blasewitz, 1899–1900, destroyed in 1945
- Franz-Liszt-Strasse 19, Strehlen, 1899
- Hähnelstraße 13, Johannstadt, four-story country house, destroyed
- Degelestraße 3 (Villa Wolff), Weißer Hirsch, 1901, Neo-Baroque
- Residential colony Altfriedstein in the Niederlößnitz district of Radebeul, from 1902
  - Conversion of the mansion Altfriedstein, 1902
  - Villa at Prof.-Wilhelm-Ring 20, 1902
  - Landhaus Ludwig-Richter-Allee 27, 1902–03
  - Country house Prof.-Wilhelm-Ring 16 (Radebeul), 1903
  - Hermann Ebert tenement house, Moritzburger Strasse 45, 1903
  - Villa Elisabeth's peace, Prof.-Wilhelm-Ring 10, 1903
  - House at Lindenaustrasse 7 (Radebeul), 1903–04
  - House Schilling, Auenstraße 51, Apolda, Thuringia, 1904–06
  - Detached house at Ludwig-Richter-Allee 30, 1905
  - Detached house at Ludwig-Richter-Allee 31, 1905–06
  - Detached house at Ludwig-Richter-Allee 32, 1905–06
  - Detached house at Ludwig-Richter-Allee 33, 1905–06
  - Paul Nieschke House, Ludwig-Richter-Allee 28, 1906
  - Landhaus Lutzmann House, Lindenaustrasse 3, 1906
  - Landhaus Prof.-Wilhelm-Ring 18, 1906
  - Villa Alfred Sparbert, Prof.-Wilhelm-Ring 19, 1907
  - Landhaus Altfriedstein 7, 1910
  - Meyerburg, Mohrenstrasse 5, 1911–12
  - Landhaus Lindenaustrasse 1, 1916–17
- Villa Würzburger, Johannstadt, 1910

== Churches ==
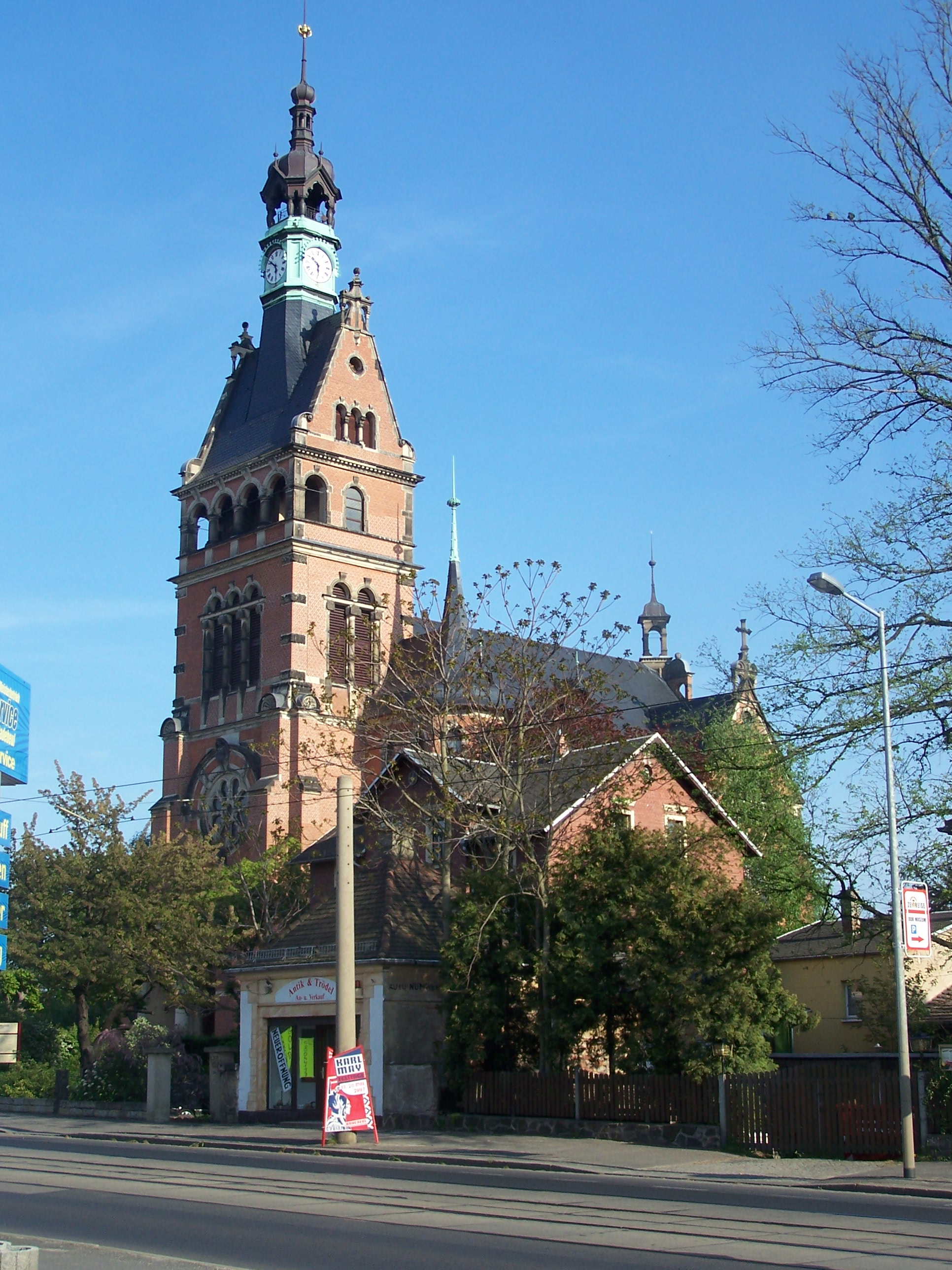
Lutherkirche Radebeul.

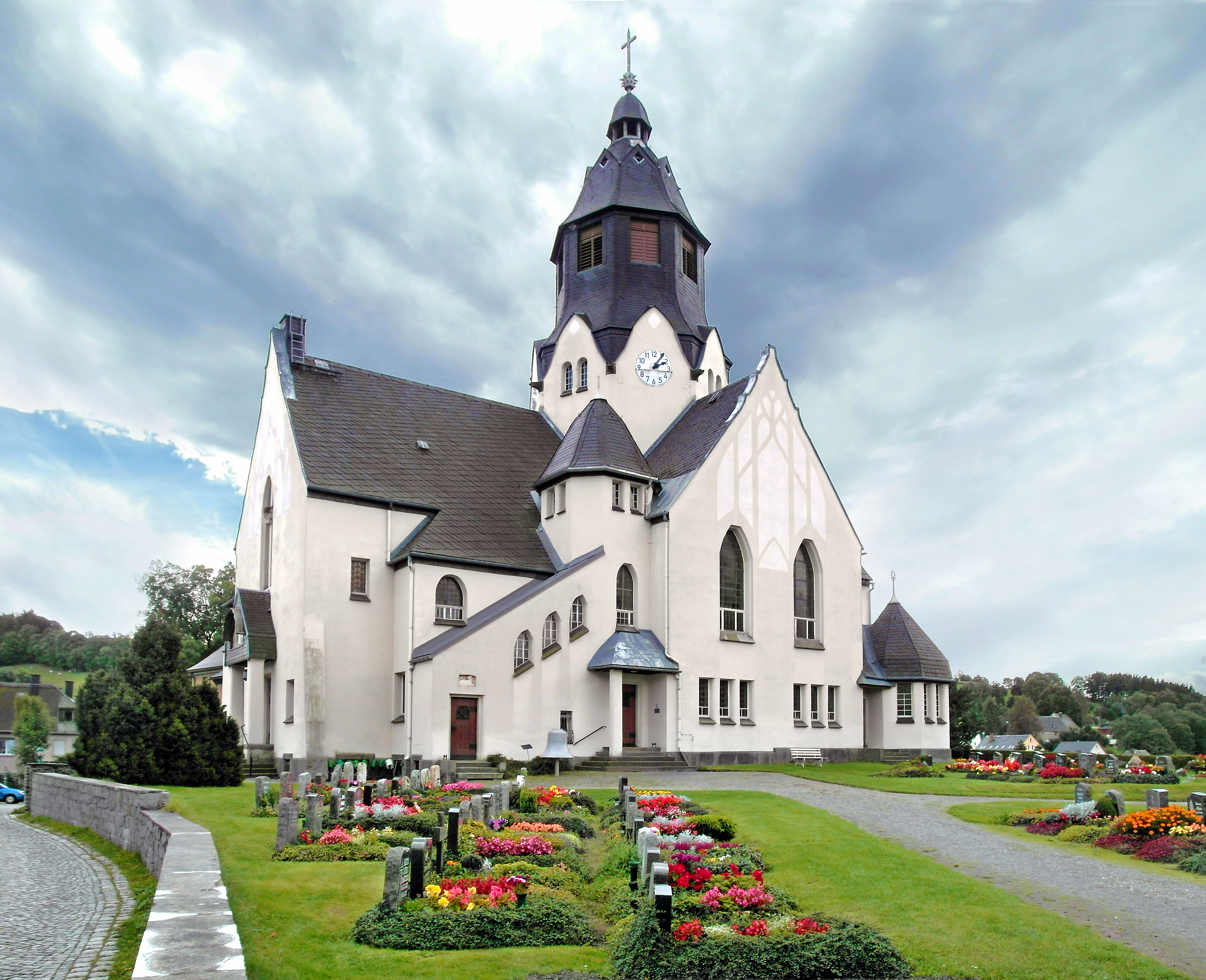
St. Trinitatiskirche Wiesa (Thermalbad Wiesenbad)

- Lutherkirche (Radebeul), Neo-Renaissance, 1891 (with neighboring vicarage and the associated cemetery chapel on the Friedhof Radebeul-Ost)
- Church in de:Hohenfichte, 1893–96
- Interior of the Church of St. Peter in Schellenberg, Neo-Baroque, 1895
- Resurrection Church in Stenn, 1895–96
- Competition design for the new church in Leuben, 1898, 2nd prize, not executed
- New interior of the burnt out Kreuzkirche in Dresden, 1897–1900, destroyed during the Second World War except for small remains
- Conversion of the evangelical church in Cannewitz, 1900
- New tower of the evangelical church in Bergen (Vogtland), 1900
- Protective porch for the Golden Gate at the Freiberg Cathedral, 1902
- Christ Church (so-called “Green Church”) in Teplice, (now Czech Republic), 1899–1905, Art Nouveau, demolished 1973
- Lutherkirche in Dux, 1899–1901
- Churches in Hohenelbe and Klostergrab, 1900–03
- Church of the German Evangelical Congregation in Mittel Langenau, 1902, elevated to a parish church in 1916, demolished in 1979
- St. Trinity Church in Wiesa (Ore Mountains), 1902–1904
- Christuskirche in Dresden-Strehlen, 1903–05
- Cemetery chapel in Rochlitz, 1905
- Lutherkirche in Zwickau, Art Nouveau, built in 1906 as a garrison church
- Reconstruction of the cruciform church in Hirschberg in the Giant Mountains, 1909
- Conversion of the Jakobikirche in Chemnitz, redesign of the west facade, Art Nouveau, 1911
- Zionskirche, Südvorstadt, Dresden, 1912–14
- Peace Church in Aue-Zelle, 1912–14
- Design for a Protestant parish church in Schinkel near Osnabrück, published in 1915
- Design for a Protestant parish church in de:Reumtengrün near Auerbach/Vogtl., published in 1915
- Villa Würzburger, Johannstadt, 1910

=== Houses in Dresden ===
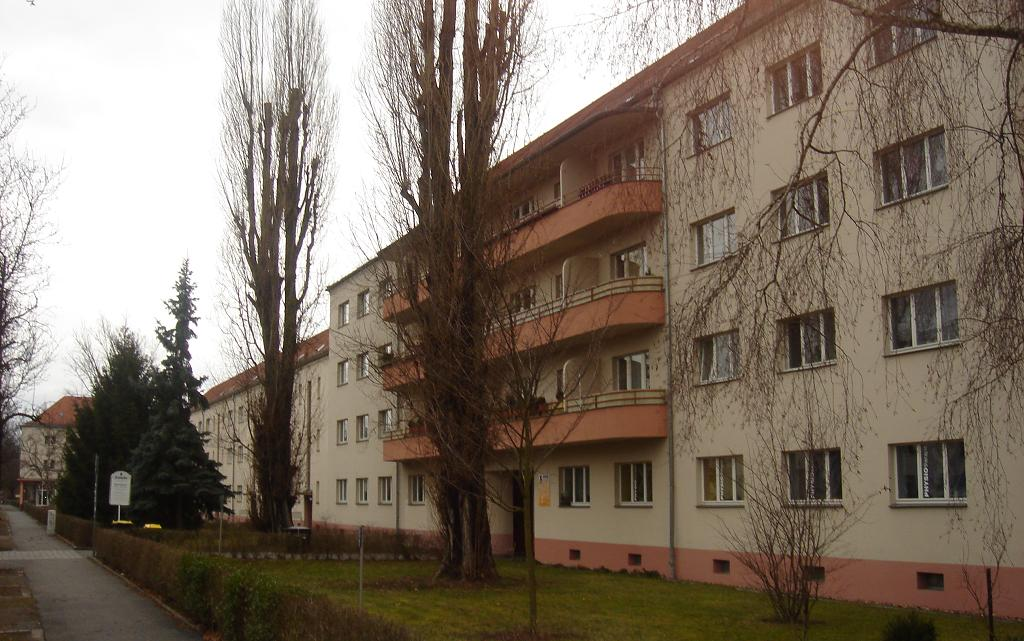
Row of houses on Aachener Strasse in Trachau

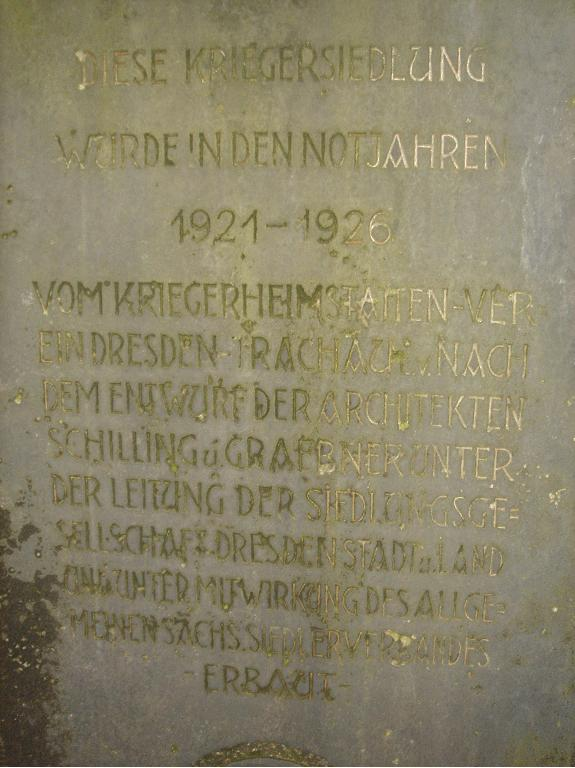
Memorial stone in the warrior settlement of Trachau

- Leipziger Strasse 32–34, de:Leipziger Vorstadt, residential buildings for the Dresdner Spar- und Bauverein, 1901, sparsely decorated and functionalist
- Coschützer Strasse 54–56, Plauen, residential buildings for the Dresden Spar- und Bauverein, 1902, sparsely decorated and functionalist
- Warrior settlement Dresden-Trachau, 1921–26,
- Trachau housing estate, together with Hans Richter, Hans Waloschek and others, 1928–39, especially rows of houses on Aachener Straße
- "Rudolf-Schilling-Haus" on Holbeinstrasse and Tittmannstrasse, today the Johannstadt housing association
- Reick settlement, together with de:Rudolf Bitzan and others

=== Other buildings and projects ===
- Expansion of the facilities of the Sonnenstein Sanitary Home in Pirna (from 1890)
- Old de:Friedhofskapelle Friedhof Radebeul-Ost, 1890
- Pieschen Town Hall, 1890–91
- Commercial building Kaiserpalast for Hermann Ilgen on Pirnaischer Platz in Dresden, 1896, neo-baroque style, burned 1945, demolished 1951
- Löbtau Town Hall, 1896–98, destroyed
- Draft of a restoration building in the form of a Japanese Rococo pavilion for the 1897 German Art Exhibition in Dresden
- Hotel Ratskeller in Schwarzenberg (reconstruction of the burnt down town hall, 1906)
- Draft for the portal to the arts and crafts department and large hall for the German Art Exhibition in 1899
- Wine salon Stadt Gotha in Dresden-Altstadt, Schloßstraße 11, 1900, destroyed
- Sächsische Handelsbank, Ringstraße 10/12, Dresden-Altstadt, 1900
- Coffee shop Max Thürmer in the Viktoriahaus, Waisenhausstraße, Dresden-Altstadt, 1901, destroyed
- Wettin Fountain in Waldheim (Saxony), 1902–03
- AOK administration building at Sternplatz in Dresden, de:Wilsdruffer Vorstadt, 1912–13
- Consecration hall, mortuary, gardener's house and gate at the St. Pauli Cemetery in Dresden, 1909
- Exhibition stand for the Rother'sche Kunstziegeleien GmbH / Ceramic art workshops Richard Mutz & Rother GmbH from Liegnitz (Lower Silesia) at the II. German Clay, Cement and Lime Industry Exhibition in Berlin-Baumschulenweg
- Spa center Bad Gottleuba, 1909–13, 34 Art Nouveau buildings
- Some buildings of the de:Lahmann Sanatorium in Dresden-Weißer Hirsch, 1912
- Dyeing and sorting building of Kammgarnspinnerei AG in Leipzig, Dr.-Kurt-Fischer-Straße 31, 1934–36, demolished in 2007
