= Julius Graebner =

German architect

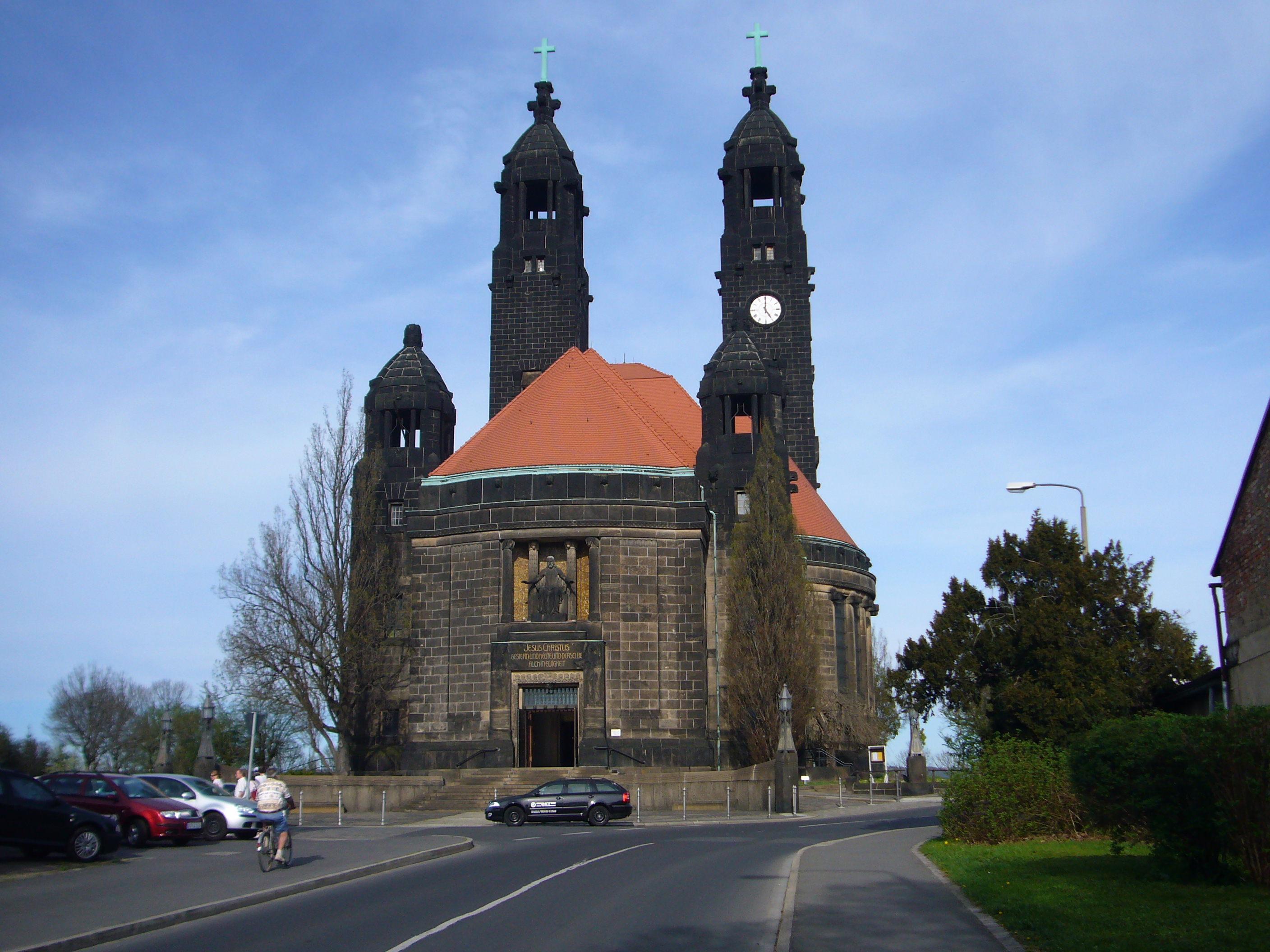
The Dresden Christ Church, one of the important works by Schilling & Graebner

Julius Wilhelm Graebner (11 January 1858 - July 25, 1917) was a German architect. He had his main creative phase in the Dresden architecture firm Schilling & Graebner in the three decades from 1889 until his death.

== Life and work ==
Born in Baden, he was the son of an undressed hosiery and first attended high school in Karlsruhe . Between 1876 and 1879 he then began studying architecture at the Technische Hochschule in Karlsruhe there, which he had to interrupt due to military service and continued in Dresden at the Polytechnic in 1880 . There he met Rudolf Schilling, who would later become his partner in a joint architectural office. After completing his training, during which he worked particularly through his professors Josef Durm, Karl Weißbach and Ernst Giese was influenced, he went to Berlin in 1883 . There he worked in the offices of Heinrich Joseph Kayser and Karl von Großheim, and Hans Grisebach and worked on various smaller projects. Back in Dresden, he teamed up with his former classmates Schilling in 1889 the office Schilling & Graebner. Together, they created primarily in Saxony a variety initially historical buildings, then at the Art Nouveau and the reform architecture of the early Modern oriented churches, villas, Town halls and other buildings. Graebner, who was promoted to royal building council in 1909, was closely connected with the city building councilor Hans Erlwein and with Ferdinand Avenarius, for whom he also designed a villa in Blasewitz.

Julius Wilhelm Graebner died in 1917 during a business trip in what is now Istanbul to typhoid. His son Erwin Graebner, after returning from the front of the First World War in October 1918, continued the architecture firm Schilling & Graebner together with Schilling. Julius Graebner was buried at the Melaten cemetery in Cologne.

== Major works ==
- See Schilling & Graebner

== Available literature ==
- Paul, Schaefer (1928). Schillung und Graebner. Architekten B.D.A. Dresden. Eine Auswahl Bauten (First ed.). Berlin: Maximilian Maul.
- Kube, Richarda (1988). Schilling und Graebner (1889–1917) – Das Werk einer Dresdner Architektenfirma (Vol I and II ed.). Dresden: Dissertation from TU Dresden.
