= Johannes Schilling =

German sculptor (1828–1910)

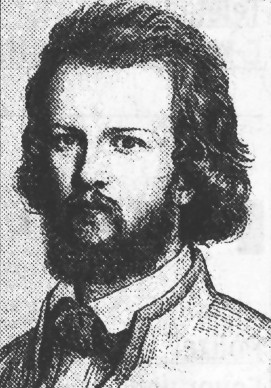
Johannes Schilling

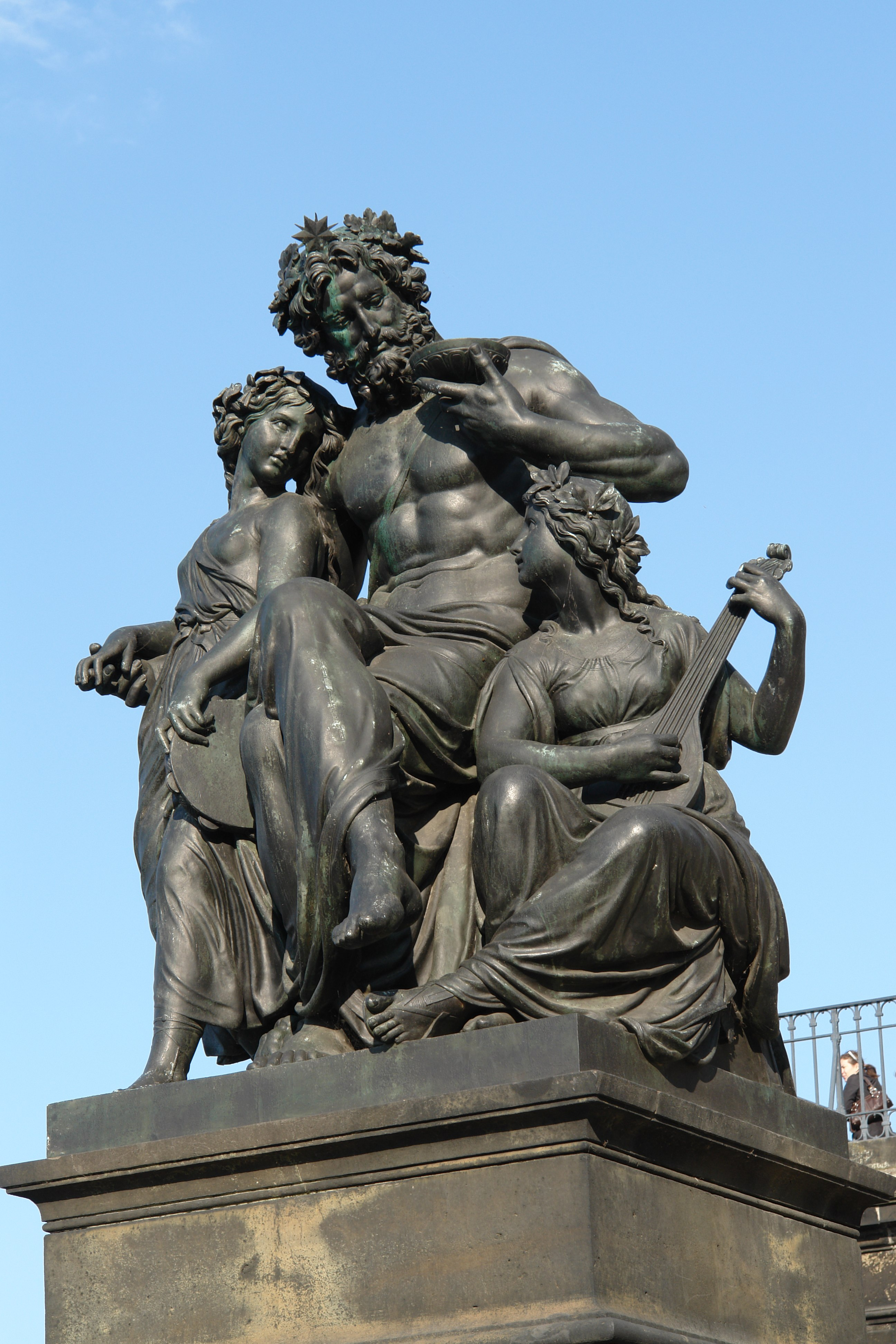
"Evening", from a sculpture series, The Four Times of Day (1868)

Johannes Schilling (23 June 1828 – 21 March 1910) was a German sculptor.

== Life and work ==
Johannes Schilling was born in Mittweida as the youngest of five children. A year after his birth, his family moved to Dresden, where he grew up. At the age of six, he was sent to a private school and, at fourteen, attended the Dresden Academy of Fine Arts where he was taught drawing by Karl Gottlieb Peschel. After graduating in 1845, he became one of the master pupils in the studio of sculptor Ernst Rietschel. In 1851 and 1852, he went to Berlin to continue his studies with Christian Daniel Rauch and Friedrich Drake.

In 1852, he returned to Dresden, where he worked in the studios of Ernst Julius Hähnel. From 1854 to 1856, he took a study trip to Rome. Finally, in 1857, he established his own studio. That same year, he married Louise Arnold, daughter of the late publisher Ernst Sigismund Arnold (1792–1840). Among their children were Rudolf Schilling, an architect and co-owner of the construction firm Schilling & Graebner, and Katharina Susanna Schilling, who became the wife of chemist Arthur Hantzsch. The writer and historian Heinar Schilling was a child of his second marriage to Minna Neubert.

In 1868, he became a Professor at the Academy, a position he held until his death. By 1888, he was sufficiently famous to establish a museum (designed by his son, Rudolf) to display his models and designs. It was destroyed in 1945, as was most of Dresden by the fire bombing of Dresden by the British/Americans.

Schilling died in 1910 in Klotzsche near Dresden. After his death, as a part of his legacy, the city of Mittweida was directed to build a private museum, but these plans had not been realized by 1914 and were put on hold at the outbreak of World War I. His legacy was not fulfilled until 2005, when the Schilling House was established.

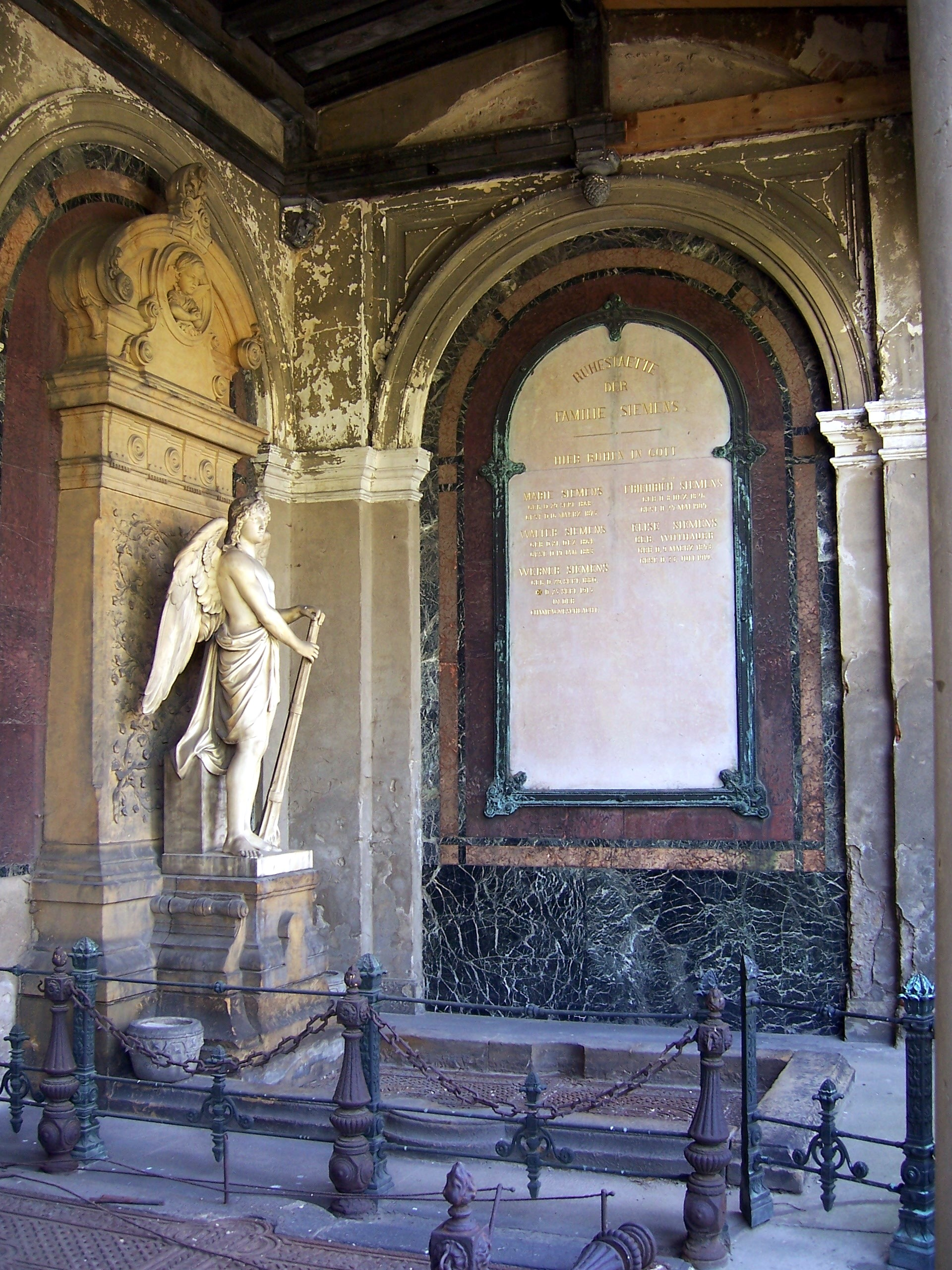
Grave of Friedrich Siemens sculpted by Johannes Schilling

Among Schilling's sculptures there are Emperor William's monument in Hamburg, the sculpture series The Four Times of Day (Schilling), and the Maximilian monument in Piazza Venezia, Trieste. He also contributed to the Luther Monument of Worms.
