= Rudolf Schilling =

German architect

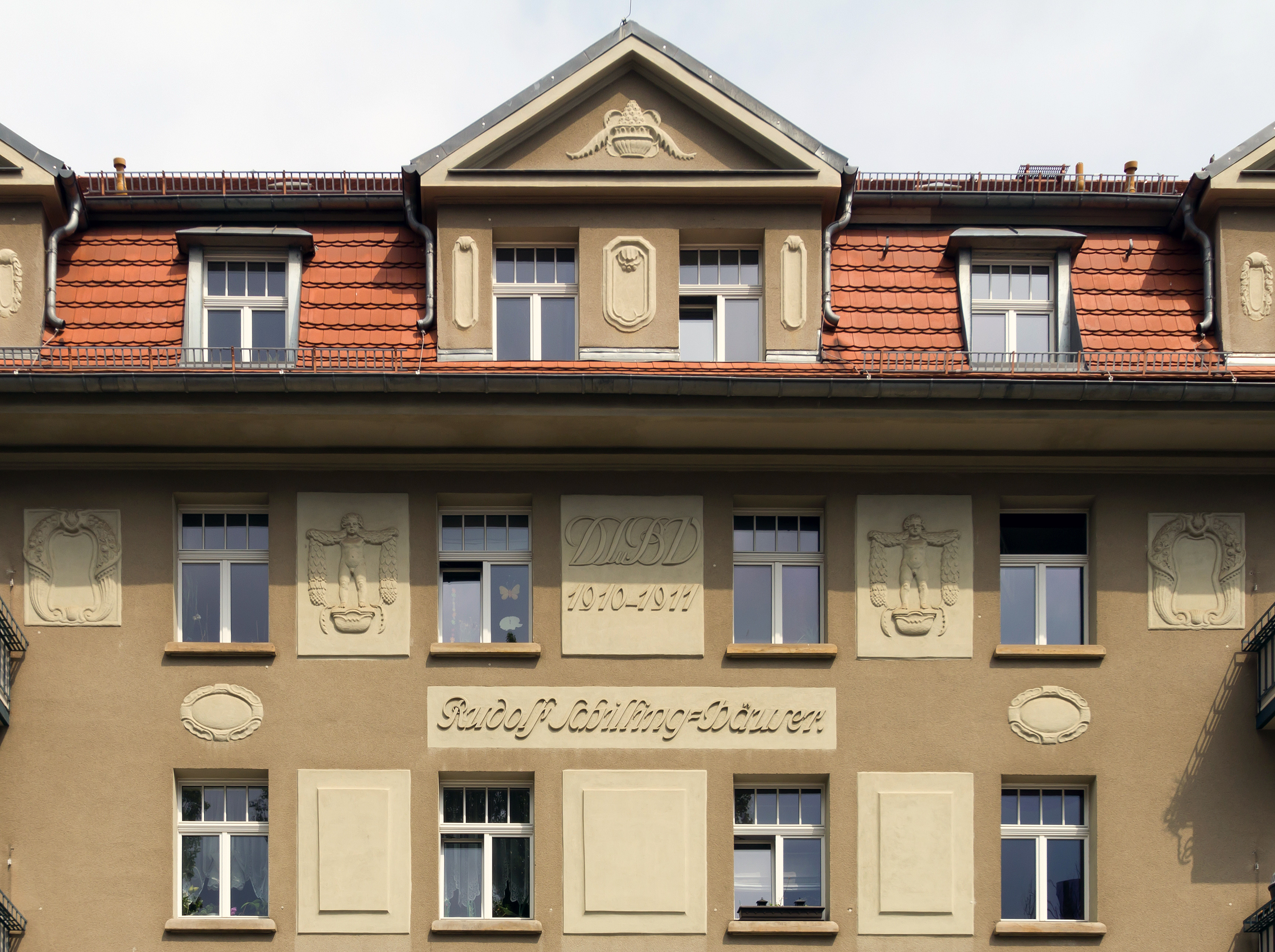
Facade decorations at the Rudolf Schilling houses on Holbeinstrasse in Dresden

Georg Rudolf Schilling (June 1, 1859 — December 19, 1933) was a German architect. He was associated with the Dresden architecture firm Schilling & Graebner.

== Early life ==
Born as a son of the sculptor Johannes Schilling. He studied architecture at the Dresden Polytechnic from 1879, where he was particularly influenced by Professor Karl Weißbach. Here, Schilling also got to know Julius Graebner, who would later become his partner in a joint architectural office. From 1880, the study was for one year because of his military service with the Saxon Army. It was interrupted, only to be completed in 1883. Thereafter, Schilling worked temporarily in an architecture firm in Munich and from 1884 to 1886 in Berlin with Hermann Ende and Wilhelm Böckmann. He then established himself as an independent architect in Dresden, his birthplace and place of study.

== Career ==
In 1889, he founded the Schilling & Graebner office together with his former fellow Julius Graebner. Together, they created primarily in Saxony a plurality of first historical buildings, then in Nouveau and the reform architecture of the early Modern oriented churches, administration buildings, private houses, large residential complexes and other buildings. Schilling had the title of a royal building council. After his business partner Julius Wilhelm Graebner died in August 1917, Schilling ran the architecture firm Schilling and Graebner with his son Erwin Graebner.

Schilling himself died in 1933 of a stroke and his burial is located on the Johannisfriedhof in Tolkewitz.

== Notable works ==
Before working with Julius Wilhelm Graebner, Schilling essentially designed two buildings on Pillnitzer Straße in the suburb of Pirnaische Vorstadt around 1887. These include the Schilling Museum, part of the Dresden Municipal Collections, and the Schilling family home. Both were destroyed and not rebuilt in the February 13, 1945 bombing. The other works were created in the Schilling & Graebner office and are noted in the article there.
