= Borgo Giuseppino =

Neighbourhood in Trieste, Italy

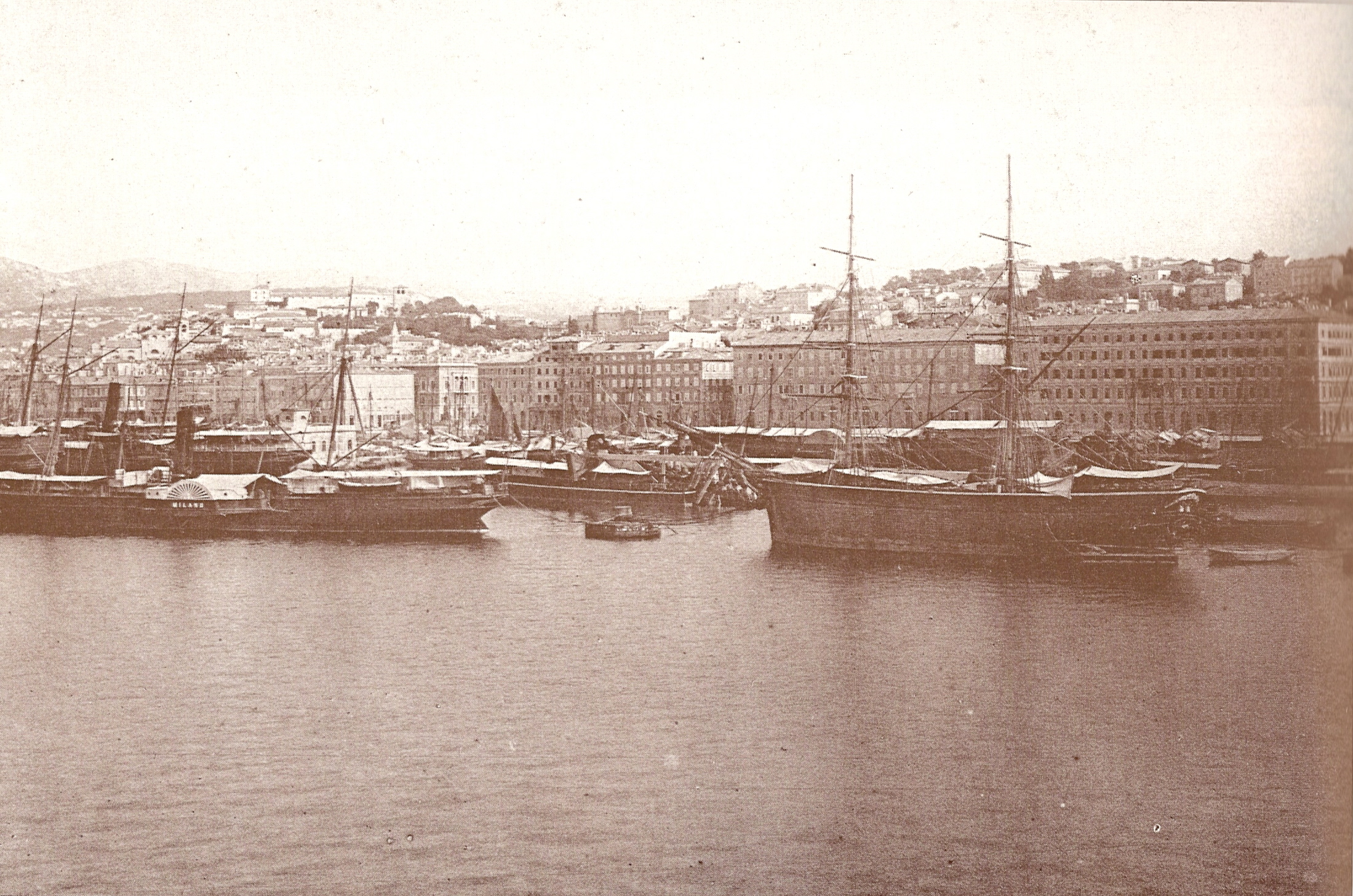
- 1893

- Location within Italy Location within Friuli-Venezia Giulia
- Country: Italy
- Region: Friuli-Venezia Giulia
- Frazione: Trieste
- Area code: 040

The Borgo Giuseppino is a neighbourhood of Trieste, Italy, planned and built starting from the end of the 18th century. The name comes from the Emperor of Austria Joseph II, Holy Roman Emperor, son of the empress Maria Theresa of Austria.
